= Screw joint =

Kinematic pair which constrains bodies to linear motion along an axis

A screw joint is a one-degree-of-freedom kinematic pair used in mechanisms. Screw joints provide single-axis translation by utilizing the threads of a lead screw to provide such translation. This type of joint is used primarily on most types of linear actuators and certain types of cartesian robots.

A screw joint is sometimes considered as a separate type but it is actually a variation of bolted joint. The difference is that a screw is used rather than a bolt, thus requiring an internal thread in one of the jointed parts. This can save space, however, continuous reuse of the thread would probably damage the coils, making the whole part unsuitable.

== See also ==
- Biological screw joint
- Cylindrical joint
- Degrees of freedom (mechanics)
- Kinematic pair
- Kinematics
- Mechanical joint
