= Mechanical efficiency =

Ratio of the output to input power of a machine

In mechanical engineering, mechanical efficiency is a dimensionless ratio that measures the efficiency of a mechanism or machine in transforming the power input to the device to power output. A machine is a mechanical linkage in which force is applied at one point, and the force does work moving a load at another point. At any instant the power input to a machine is equal to the input force multiplied by the velocity of the input point, similarly the power output is equal to the force exerted on the load multiplied by the velocity of the load. The mechanical efficiency of a machine (often represented by the Greek letter eta η) is a dimensionless number between 0 and 1 that is the ratio between the power output of the machine and the power input

$$\eta = \frac{\text{Power output}}{\text{Power input}}$$

Since a machine does not contain a source of energy, nor can it store energy, from conservation of energy the power output of a machine can never be greater than its input, so the efficiency can never be greater than 1.

All real machines lose energy to friction; the energy is dissipated as heat. Therefore, their power output is less than their power input

$$\text{Power output} = \text{Power input} - \text{Frictional power loss}$$

Therefore, the efficiency of all real machines is less than 1. A hypothetical machine without friction is called an ideal machine; such a machine would not have any energy losses, so its output power would equal its input power, and its efficiency would be 1 (100%).

For hydropower turbines the efficiency is referred to as hydraulic efficiency.

== See also ==
- Mechanical advantage
- Thermal efficiency
- Electrical efficiency
- Internal combustion engine
- Electric motor
- Velocity ratio
