= Prismatic joint =

Kinematic pair which constrains bodies to sliding along an axis without rotating

Prismatic joint seen in 2-dimensional form. Only linear motion is possible. In contrast to a revolute joint the axis is prevented from rotating (this can be accomplished by giving the axis a prismatic shape which is not visible here).

A prismatic joint is a one-degree-of-freedom kinematic pair which constrains the motion of two bodies to sliding along a common axis, without rotation; for this reason it is often called a slider (as in the slider-crank linkage) or a sliding pair. They are often utilized in hydraulic and pneumatic cylinders.

A prismatic joint can be formed with a polygonal cross-section to resist rotation. Examples of this include the dovetail joint and linear bearings.

== See also ==
- Cylindrical joint
- Degrees of freedom (mechanics)
- Kinematic pair
- Kinematics
- Mechanical joint
- Revolute joint
