= Mechanical advantage =

Measure of the force amplification achieved by using a tool

Mechanical advantage is a measure of the force amplification achieved by using a tool, mechanical device or machine system. The device trades off input forces against movement to obtain a desired amplification in the output force. The model for this is the law of the lever. Machine components designed to manage forces and movement in this way are called mechanisms. An ideal mechanism transmits power without adding to and subtracting from it. This means the ideal machine does not include a power source, is frictionless, and is constructed from rigid bodies that do not deflect or wear. The performance of a real system relative to this ideal is expressed in terms of efficiency factors that take into account departures from the ideal.

== Levers ==
The lever is a movable bar that pivots on a fulcrum attached to or positioned on or across a fixed point. The lever operates by applying forces at different distances from the fulcrum, or pivot. The location of the fulcrum determines a lever's class. Where a lever rotates continuously, it functions as a rotary second-class lever. The motion of the lever's end-point describes a fixed orbit, where mechanical energy can be exchanged.

In modern times, this kind of rotary leverage is widely used, such as gears, pulleys or friction drives used in a mechanical power transmission scheme. It is common for mechanical advantage to be manipulated in a 'collapsed' form, via the use of more than one gear (a gearset). In such a gearset, gears having smaller radii and less inherent mechanical advantage are used. In order to make use of non-collapsed mechanical advantage, it is necessary to use a 'true length' rotary lever.

As the lever pivots on the fulcrum, points farther from this pivot move faster than points closer to the pivot. The power into and out of the lever is the same, so must come out the same when calculations are being done. Power is the product of force and velocity, so forces applied to points farther from the pivot must be less than when applied to points closer in.

If a and b are distances from the fulcrum to points A and B and if force F_{A} applied to A is the input force and F_{B} exerted at B is the output, the ratio of the velocities of points A and B is given by a/b so the ratio of the output force to the input force, or mechanical advantage, is given by

$$\mathit{MA} = \frac{F_b}{F_a} = \frac{a}{b}.$$

This is the law of the lever, which Archimedes formulated using geometric reasoning. It shows that if the distance a from the fulcrum to where the input force is applied (point A) is greater than the distance b from fulcrum to where the output force is applied (point B), then the lever amplifies the input force. If the distance from the fulcrum to the input force is less than from the fulcrum to the output force, then the lever reduces the input force. To Archimedes, who recognized the profound implications and practicalities of the law of the lever, has been attributed the famous claim, "Give me a place to stand and with a lever I will move the whole world."

The use of velocity in the static analysis of a lever is an application of the principle of virtual work.

== Speed ratio ==
The requirement for power input to an ideal mechanism to equal power output provides a simple way to compute mechanical advantage from the input-output speed ratio of the system.

The power input to a gear train with a torque T_{A} applied to the drive pulley which rotates at an angular velocity of ω_{A} is P=T_{A}ω_{A}.

Because the power flow is constant, the torque T_{B} and angular velocity ω_{B} of the output gear must satisfy the relation

$$P = T_A \omega_A = T_B \omega_B, \!$$

which yields

$$\mathit{MA} = \frac{T_B}{T_A} = \frac{\omega_A}{\omega_B}.$$

This shows that for an ideal mechanism the input-output speed ratio equals the mechanical advantage of the system. This applies to all mechanical systems ranging from robots to linkages.

== Gear trains ==
Gear teeth are designed so that the number of teeth on a gear is proportional to the radius of its pitch circle, and so that the pitch circles of meshing gears roll on each other without slipping. The speed ratio for a pair of meshing gears can be computed from ratio of the radii of the pitch circles and the ratio of the number of teeth on each gear, its gear ratio.

Two meshing gears transmit rotational motion.

The velocity v of the point of contact on the pitch circles is the same on both gears, and is given by

$$v = r_A \omega_A = r_B \omega_B,\!$$

where input gear A has radius r_{A} and meshes with output gear B of radius r_{B}, therefore,

$$\frac{\omega_A}{\omega_B} = \frac{r_B}{r_A} = \frac{N_B}{N_A}.$$

where N_{A} is the number of teeth on the input gear and N_{B} is the number of teeth on the output gear.

The mechanical advantage of a pair of meshing gears for which the input gear has N_{A} teeth and the output gear has N_{B} teeth is given by

$$\mathit{MA} = \frac{r_B}{r_A}  = \frac{N_B}{N_A}.$$

This shows that if the output gear G_{B} has more teeth than the input gear G_{A}, then the gear train amplifies the input torque. If the output gear has fewer teeth than the input gear, then the gear train reduces the input torque.

If the output gear of a gear train rotates more slowly than the input gear, then the gear train is called a speed reducer (Force multiplier). In this case, because the output gear must have more teeth than the input gear, the speed reducer will amplify the input torque.

== Chain and belt drives ==
Mechanisms consisting of two sprockets connected by a chain, or two pulleys connected by a belt are designed to provide a specific mechanical advantage in power transmission systems.

The velocity v of the chain or belt is the same when in contact with the two sprockets or pulleys:

$$v = r_A \omega_A = r_B \omega_B,\!$$

where the input sprocket or pulley A meshes with the chain or belt along the pitch radius r_{A} and the output sprocket or pulley B meshes with this chain or belt along the pitch radius r_{B},

therefore

$$\frac{\omega_A}{\omega_B} = \frac{r_B}{r_A} = \frac{N_B}{N_A}.$$

where N_{A} is the number of teeth on the input sprocket and N_{B} is the number of teeth on the output sprocket. For a toothed belt drive, the number of teeth on the sprocket can be used. For friction belt drives the pitch radius of the input and output pulleys must be used.

The mechanical advantage of a pair of a chain drive or toothed belt drive with an input sprocket with N_{A} teeth and the output sprocket has N_{B} teeth is given by

$$\mathit{MA} = \frac{T_B}{T_A}  = \frac{N_B}{N_A}.$$

The mechanical advantage for friction belt drives is given by

$$\mathit{MA} = \frac{T_B}{T_A} = \frac{r_B}{r_A}.$$

Chains and belts dissipate power through friction, stretch and wear, which means the power output is actually less than the power input, which means the mechanical advantage of the real system will be less than that calculated for an ideal mechanism. A chain or belt drive can lose as much as 5% of the power through the system in friction heat, deformation and wear, in which case the efficiency of the drive is 95%.

=== Example: bicycle chain drive ===
Mechanical advantage in different gears of a bicycle. Typical forces applied to the bicycle pedal and to the ground are shown, as are corresponding distances moved by the pedal and rotated by the wheel. Note that even in low gear the MA of a bicycle is less than 1.

Consider the 18-speed bicycle with 7 in (radius) cranks and 26 in (diameter) wheels. If the sprockets at the crank and at the rear drive wheel are the same size, then the ratio of the output force on the tire to the input force on the pedal can be calculated from the law of the lever to be

$$\mathit{MA} = \frac{F_B}{F_A} = \frac{7}{13} = 0.54.$$

Now, assume that the front sprockets have a choice of 28 and 52 teeth, and that the rear sprockets have a choice of 16 and 32 teeth. Using different combinations, we can compute the following speed ratios between the front and rear sprockets

Speed ratios and total MA
	input	output	speed ratio	crank-wheel ratio	total MA
low speed	28	32	1.14	0.54	0.62
mid 1	52	32	0.62	0.54	0.33
mid 2	28	16	0.57	0.54	0.31
high speed	52	16	0.30	0.54	0.16

The ratio of the force driving the bicycle to the force on the pedal, which is the total mechanical advantage of the bicycle, is the product of the speed ratio (or teeth ratio of output sprocket/input sprocket) and the crank-wheel lever ratio.

Notice that in every case the force on the pedals is greater than the force driving the bicycle forward (in the illustration above, the corresponding backward-directed reaction force on the ground is indicated).

== Block and tackle ==
A block and tackle is an assembly of a rope and pulleys that is used to lift loads. A number of pulleys are assembled together to form the blocks, one that is fixed and one that moves with the load. The rope is threaded through the pulleys to provide mechanical advantage that amplifies that force applied to the rope.

In order to determine the mechanical advantage of a block and tackle system consider the simple case of a gun tackle, which has a single mounted, or fixed, pulley and a single movable pulley. The rope is threaded around the fixed block and falls down to the moving block where it is threaded around the pulley and brought back up to be knotted to the fixed block.

The mechanical advantage of a block and tackle equals the number of sections of rope that support the moving block; shown here it is 2, 3, 4, 5, and 6, respectively.

Let S be the distance from the axle of the fixed block to the end of the rope, which is A where the input force is applied. Let R be the distance from the axle of the fixed block to the axle of the moving block, which is B where the load is applied.

The total length of the rope L can be written as

$$L = 2R + S + K, \!$$

where K is the constant length of rope that passes over the pulleys and does not change as the block and tackle moves.

The velocities V_{A} and V_{B} of the points A and B are related by the constant length of the rope, that is

$$\dot{L}=2\dot{R} + \dot{S}=0,$$

or

$$\dot{S} = -2\dot{R}.$$

The negative sign shows that the velocity of the load is opposite to the velocity of the applied force, which means as we pull down on the rope the load moves up.

Let V_{A} be positive downwards and V_{B} be positive upwards, so this relationship can be written as the speed ratio

$$\frac{V_A}{V_B} = \frac{\dot{S}}{-\dot{R}} = 2,$$

where 2 is the number of rope sections supporting the moving block.

Let F_{A} be the input force applied at A the end of the rope, and let F_{B} be the force at B on the moving block. Like the velocities F_{A} is directed downwards and F_{B} is directed upwards.

For an ideal block and tackle system there is no friction in the pulleys and no deflection or wear in the rope, which means the power input by the applied force F_{A}V_{A} must equal the power out acting on the load F_{B}V_{B}, that is

$$F_A V_A = F_B V_B.\!$$

The ratio of the output force to the input force is the mechanical advantage of an ideal gun tackle system,

$$\mathit{MA} = \frac{F_B}{F_A} =  \frac{V_A}{V_B}  = 2.\!$$

This analysis generalizes to an ideal block and tackle with a moving block supported by n rope sections,

$$\mathit{MA} = \frac{F_B}{F_A} =  \frac{V_A}{V_B}  = n.\!$$

This shows that the force exerted by an ideal block and tackle is n times the input force, where n is the number of sections of rope that support the moving block.

== Efficiency ==
Mechanical advantage that is computed using the assumption that no power is lost through deflection, friction and wear of a machine is the maximum performance that can be achieved. For this reason, it is often called the ideal mechanical advantage (IMA). In operation, deflection, friction and wear will reduce the mechanical advantage. The amount of this reduction from the ideal to the actual mechanical advantage (AMA) is defined by a factor called efficiency, a quantity which is determined by experimentation.

As an example, using a block and tackle with six rope sections and a 600 lb load, the operator of an ideal system would be required to pull the rope six feet and exert 100 lb_{F} of force to lift the load one foot. Both the ratios F_{out} / F_{in} and V_{in} / V_{out} show that the IMA is six. For the first ratio, 100 lb_{F} of force input results in 600 lb_{F} of force out. In an actual system, the force out would be less than 600 pounds due to friction in the pulleys. The second ratio also yields a MA of 6 in the ideal case but a smaller value in the practical scenario; it does not properly account for energy losses such as rope stretch. Subtracting those losses from the IMA or using the first ratio yields the AMA.

=== Ideal mechanical advantage ===
The ideal mechanical advantage (IMA), or theoretical mechanical advantage, is the mechanical advantage of a device with the assumption that its components do not flex, there is no friction, and there is no wear. It is calculated using the physical dimensions of the device and defines the maximum performance the device can achieve.

The assumptions of an ideal machine are equivalent to the requirement that the machine does not store or dissipate energy; the power into the machine thus equals the power out. Therefore, the power P is constant through the machine and force times velocity into the machine equals the force times velocity out—that is,

$$P = F_\text{in}v_\text{in}= F_\text{out}v_\text{out}.$$

The ideal mechanical advantage is the ratio of the force out of the machine (load) to the force into the machine (effort), or

$$\mathit{IMA} = \frac {F_\text{out}} {F_\text{in}}.$$

Applying the constant power relationship yields a formula for this ideal mechanical advantage in terms of the speed ratio:

$$\mathit{IMA} = \frac {F_\text{out}} {F_\text{in}} = \frac {v_\text{in}} {v_\text{out}}.$$

The speed ratio of a machine can be calculated from its physical dimensions. The assumption of constant power thus allows use of the speed ratio to determine the maximum value for the mechanical advantage.

=== Actual mechanical advantage ===
The actual mechanical advantage (AMA) is the mechanical advantage determined by physical measurement of the input and output forces. Actual mechanical advantage takes into account energy loss due to deflection, friction, and wear.

The AMA of a machine is calculated as the ratio of the measured force output to the measured force input,

$$\mathit{AMA} = \frac {F_\text{out}} {F_\text{in}},$$

where the input and output forces are determined experimentally.

The ratio of the experimentally determined mechanical advantage to the ideal mechanical advantage is the mechanical efficiency η of the machine,

$$\eta =\frac\mathit{AMA}\mathit{IMA}.$$

== See also ==
- Outline of machines
- Compound lever
- Simple machine
- Mechanical advantage device
- Gear ratio
- Chain drive
- Belt (mechanical)
- Roller chain
- Bicycle chain
- Bicycle gearing
- Transmission (mechanics)
- On the Equilibrium of Planes
- Mechanical efficiency
- Wedge
