= Cylindrical joint =

Kinematic pair which constrains bodies to sliding and rotating about an axis

Cylindrical joint seen in 3-dimensional view.

A cylindrical joint is a two-degrees-of-freedom kinematic pair used in mechanisms. Cylindrical joints constrain two bodies to a single axis while allowing them to rotate about and slide along that axis. This can be pictured by an unsecured axle mounted on a chassis, as it may freely rotate and translate. An example of this would be the rotating rods of a table football (foosball).

== See also ==
- Degrees of freedom (mechanics)
- Kinematic pair
- Kinematics
- Prismatic joint
- Revolute joint
