= Kinematic pair =

Connection between two physical objects which constrains their relative movement

In classical mechanics, a kinematic pair is a connection between two physical objects that imposes constraints on their relative movement (kinematics). German engineer Franz Reuleaux introduced the kinematic pair as a new approach to the study of machines that provided an advance over the notion of elements consisting of simple machines.

== Description ==
Kinematics is the branch of classical mechanics which describes the motion of points, bodies (objects) and systems of bodies (groups of objects) without consideration of the causes of motion. Kinematics as a field of study is often referred to as the "geometry of motion". For further detail, see Kinematics.

Hartenberg & Denavit presents the definition of a kinematic pair:

In the matter of connections between rigid bodies, Reuleaux recognized two kinds; he called them higher and lower pairs (of elements). With higher pairs, the two elements are in contact at a point or along a line, as in a ball bearing or disk cam and follower; the relative motions of coincident points are dissimilar. Lower pairs are those for which area contact may be visualized, as in pin connections, crossheads, ball-and socket joints and some others; the relative motion of coincident points of the elements, and hence of their links, are similar, and an exchange of elements from one link to the other does not alter the relative motion of the parts as it would with higher pairs.

In kinematics, the two connected physical objects, forming a kinematic pair, are called 'rigid bodies'. In studies of mechanisms, manipulators or robots, the two objects are typically called 'links'.

== Lower pair ==
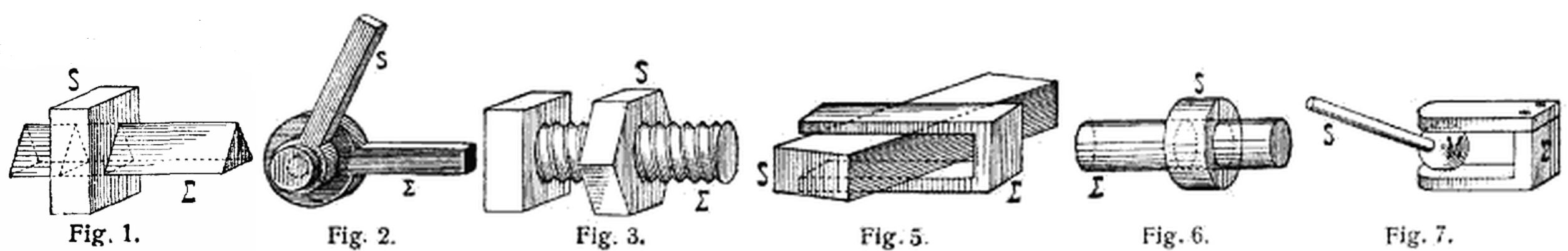
Basic types of mechanical joints: * Fig. 1: Prismatic joint, f = 1 * Fig. 2: Revolute joint, f = 1 * Fig. 3: Bolted joint, slideable along a helix, f = 1 * Fig. 5: Planar joint, slider can be moved in the plane and rotated perpendicular to it, f = 3 * Fig. 6: Cylindrical joint, axially sliding and rotatable around the axis, f = 2 * Fig. 7: Ball-and-socket joint, f = 3 (The ball is guided between two pans located opposite each other in the outer part.)

A lower pair is an ideal joint that constrains contact between a surface in the moving body to a corresponding surface in the fixed body. A lower pair is one in which there occurs a surface or area contact between two members, e.g. nut and screw, universal joint used to connect two propeller shafts.

Cases of lower joints:

- A revolute R joint, or hinged joint, requires a line in the moving body to remain co-linear with a line in the fixed body, and a plane perpendicular to this line in the moving body maintain contact with a similar perpendicular plane in the fixed body. This imposes five constraints on the relative movement of the links, which therefore has one degree of freedom.
- A prismatic P joint, or slider, requires that a line in the moving body remain co-linear with a line in the fixed body, and a plane parallel to this line in the moving body maintain contact with a similar parallel plane in the fixed body. This imposes five constraints on the relative movement of the links, which therefore has one degree of freedom.
- A screw joint or helical H joint requires cut threads in two links, so that there is a turning as well as sliding motion between them. This joint has one degree of freedom.
- A cylindrical C joint requires that a line in the moving body remain co-linear with a line in the fixed body. It is a combination of a revolute joint and a sliding joint. This joint has two degrees of freedom.
- A universal U joint consists of two intersecting, mutually orthogonal revolute joints connecting rigid links whose axes are inclined to each other.
- A spherical S joint or ball and socket joint requires that a point in the moving body remain stationary in the fixed body. This joint has three degrees of freedom, corresponding to rotations around orthogonal axes.
- A planar joint requires that a plane in the moving body maintain contact with a plane in fixed body. This joint has three degrees of freedom. The moving plane can slide in two dimensions along the fixed plane, and it can rotate on an axis normal to the fixed plane.
- A parallelogram Pa joint, is composed of four links connected together by four revolute joints at the corners of a parallelogram.

== Higher pairs ==
Generally, a higher pair is a constraint that requires a curve or surface in the moving body to maintain contact with a curve or surface in the fixed body. For example, the contact between a cam and its follower is a higher pair called a cam joint. Similarly, the contact between the involute curves that form the meshing teeth of two gears are cam joints, as is a wheel rolling on a surface. It has a point or line contact.

== Wrapping pair/ Higher pair ==
A wrapping/higher pair is a constraint that comprises belts, chains, and such other devices. A belt-driven pulley is an example of this pair. In this type of which is very similar to the higher pair (which is having point or line contact), but having multiple point contact.

== Joint notation ==
=== Context ===
Mechanisms, manipulators or robots are typically composed of links connected together by joints. Serial manipulators, like the SCARA robot, connect a moving platform to a base through a single chain of links and joints. In robotics the moving platform is called the 'end effector'. Multiple serial chains connect the moving platform to the base of parallel manipulators, like the Gough-Stewart mechanism. The individual serial chains of parallel manipulators are called 'limbs' or 'legs'. Topology refers to the arrangement of links and joints forming a manipulator or robot. Joint notation is a convenient way of defining the joint topology of mechanisms, manipulators or robots.

=== Abbreviations ===
Joints are abbreviated as follows: prismatic P, revolute R, universal U, cylindrical C, spherical S, parallelogram Pa. Actuated or active joints are identified by underscores, i.e., P, R, U, C, S, Pa.

=== Notation ===
Joint notation specifies the type and order of the joints forming a mechanism. It identifies the sequences of joints, starting from the abbreviation of the first joint at the base to the last abbreviation at the moving platform. For example, joint notation for the serial SCARA robot is RRP , indicating that it is composed of two active revolute joints RR followed by an active prismatic P joint. Repeated joints may be summarized by their number; so that joint notation for the SCARA robot can also be written 2RP for example. Joint notation for the parallel Gough-Stewart mechanism is 6-UPS or 6(UPS) indicating that it is composed of six identical serial limbs, each one composed of a universal U, active prismatic P and spherical S joint. Parentheses () enclose the joints of individual serial limbs.

== See also ==
- Mechanism (engineering)
- Manipulator (device)
- Linkage (mechanical)
