= Revolute joint =

Kinematic pair which constrains bodies to pure rotation about a common axis

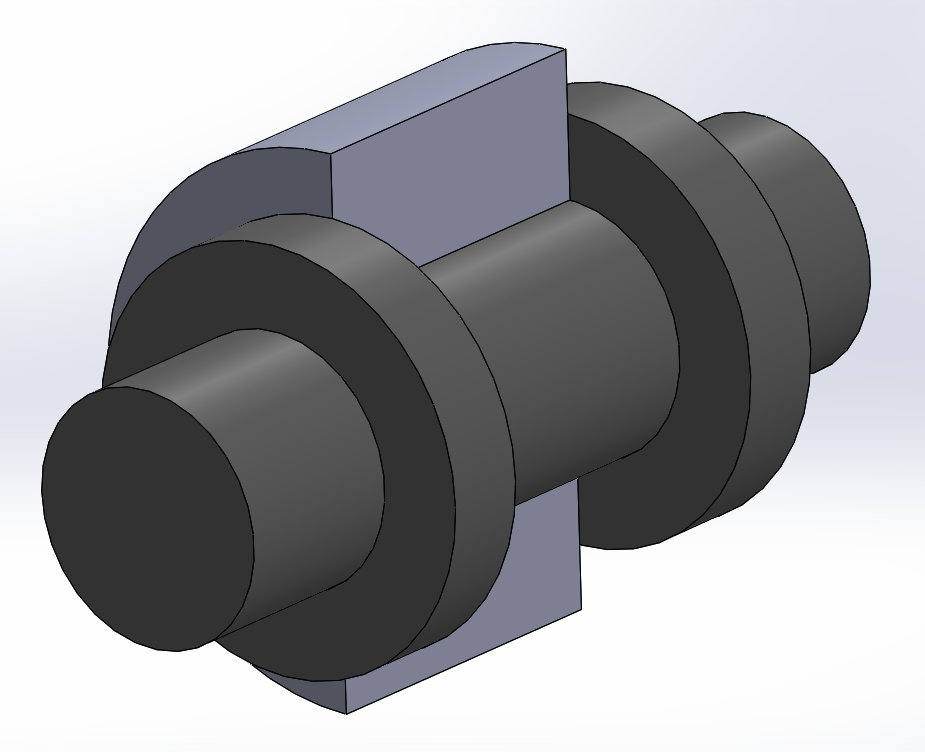
Revolute joint with and without shoulders, cutaway views

A revolute joint (also called pin joint or hinge joint) is a kinematic pair with one degree of freedom used in mechanisms and machines. The joint constrains the motion of two bodies to pure rotation along a common axis. The joint does not allow translation, or sliding linear motion, a constraint not shown in the diagram. Revolute joints are common in assemblies of multiple moving bodies. Revolute joints are used in numerous applications such as door hinges and other uniaxial rotation devices.

A revolute joint is usually made by a pin or knuckle joint, through a rotary bearing. It enforces a cylindrical contact area, which makes it a lower kinematic pair, also called a full joint. However, if there is any clearance between the pin and hole (as there must be for motion), so-called surface contact in the pin joint actually becomes line contact.

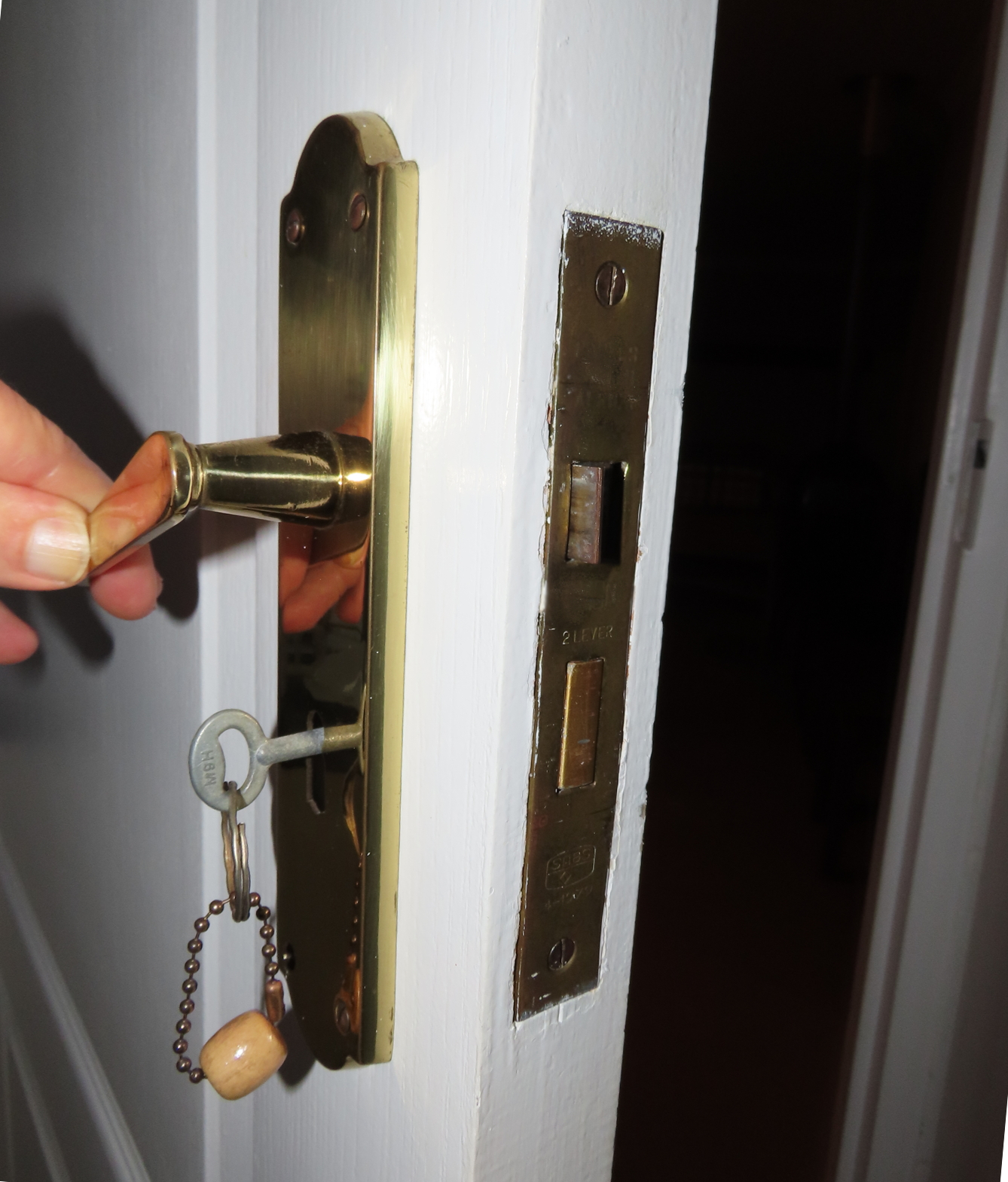
The lever of a door handle rotates an internal revolute joint to retract the tongue of the lock

The contact between the inner and outer cylindrical surfaces is usually assumed to be frictionless. But some simplified models assume linear viscous damping in the form $T=B\,\omega$, where T is the friction torque, ω is the relative angular velocity, and B is the friction constant. Some more complex models take stiction and the Stribeck effect into consideration.
