= Outline of machines =

Overview of and topical guide to machines

The following outline is provided as an overview of and topical guide to machines:

Machine – mechanical system that provides the useful application of power to achieve movement. A machine consists of a power source, or engine, and a mechanism or transmission for the controlled use of this power. The combination of force and movement, known as power, is an important characteristic of a machine.

== Essence of machines ==
- Applied mechanics
- Machining, Machinist
- Mechanical engineering
- Mechanics
- Mechanism (engineering)

== History of machines ==
- Antikythera mechanism
- Automatic lathe
- Enigma machine
- Early flying machines
- History of the bicycle
- History of computing hardware
- History of the sewing machine
- History of perpetual motion machines
- Industrial Revolution
- History of mechanical engineering
- Paper machine
- Second Industrial Revolution
- Simple machine
- Tabulating machine
- Threshing machine
- Vending machine
- Washing machine

== Machine theory ==
The mathematical tools for the analysis of movement in machines:

- Burmester theory
- Clifford algebra
- Dual quaternion
- Euler's rotation theorem
- Gear ratio
- Ideal machine
- Instantaneous center of rotation
- Mechanical advantage
- Power (physics)
- Rotation matrix
- Screw axis
- Screw theory
- Virtual work
- Work (physics)

== Machine elements ==
Movement in a machine is controlled by mechanism elements that shape the forces and movement and structural elements that support these mechanisms.

=== Mechanism elements ===
- Block
- Brake
- Clutch
- Cam
- Cam follower
- Chain drive
- Continuously variable transmission
- Drive shaft
- Epicyclic gearing
- Four-bar linkage
- Gear
- Gear train
- Geneva drive
- Kinematic coupling
- Linkage (mechanical)
- Mechanism (engineering)
- Six-bar linkage
- Sprocket
- Transmission (mechanics)
- Universal joint

=== Structural elements ===
- Frame
- Fasteners
- Bearings
- Springs
- Lubricants
- Seals
- Clevis pin, Cotter pin, Spring pin, Taper pin
- Splines
- Keys

== Types of machines and automated devices ==
- Clock
  - Atomic clock
  - Watch
  - Pendulum clock
  - Quartz clock
- Compressors and pumps
  - Archimedes' screw
  - Eductor-jet pump
  - Hydraulic ram
  - Pump
  - Trompe
  - Vacuum pump
- Conveyor systems
  - Conveyor belt
    - Treadmill
  - Conveyor transport
    - Escalator
    - Moving walkway
- Electronic machines
  - Computing machines
    - Calculator
    - Computer
  - Electronic components
    - Transistor
    - Diode
    - Capacitor
    - Resistor
    - Inductor
  - Telecommunications
    - Telephone system
- Engines
  - Heat engine: external combustion
    - Steam engine
    - Stirling engine
  - Heat engine: internal combustion
    - Reciprocating engine
    - Wankel engine
    - Jet engine
    - Rocket
  - Turbine engines
    - Gas turbine, Jet engine
    - Steam turbine
    - Water turbine
    - Wind generator
    - Windmill (Air turbine)
- Linkages
  - Pantograph
  - Peaucellier–Lipkin
- Power tools
  - Machine tools
    - Broaching machine
    - Drill press
    - Gear shaper
    - Hobbing machine
    - Hone
    - Lathe
    - Milling machine
    - Shaper
    - Planer
    - Stewart platform mills
    - Grinders
  - Hand-held power tools
    - Belt sander
    - Ceramic tile cutter tile saw
    - Chainsaw
    - Circular saw
    - Concrete saw
    - Diamond blade
    - Diamond tools
    - Disc sander
    - Drill
    - Heat gun
    - Impact wrench
    - Jigsaw
    - Nail gun
    - Powder-actuated tools
    - Random orbital sander
    - Rotary tool (such as Dremel)
    - Sander
    - Wood router
    - Trimmer
  - Other
    - Air compressor
    - Bandsaw
    - Belt sander
    - Biscuit joiner
    - Cold metal-cutting saw
    - Crusher
    - Disc sander
    - Jointer
    - Radial arm saw
    - Random orbital sander
    - Sander
    - Steel cut-off saw
    - Table saw
    - Thickness planer
    - Wood router
    - grinder
- Robotics
  - Robot
  - Android
  - Animatronic
  - Automaton
  - ASIMO
  - Industrial robot
  - Robotic arm
- Simple machine – There are only 3 fundamental machines, with 4 variations, for a total of 7 simple machines
  - Lever
  - Inclined Plane
    - Screw – combination of a wheel and an inclined plane
    - Wedge
  - Wheel
    - Pulley
    - Gear – combination of a wheel and a lever
- Vehicles
  - Man powered vehicles
    - Bicycle
    - Pedalo
  - Powered vehicles
    - Car
    - Train
    - Airplane
    - Ship
- Miscellaneous
  - Vending machine
  - Wind tunnel

== General machine-related concepts ==
- Automation
- Fabrication
- Factory
- Machine shop
- Manufacturing
- Production line
- Tools

=== Machine operations ===
- Cutting
- Deformation
- Drilling
- Edge jointing
- Knurling
- Molding
- Sanding

=== Mechanical components ===
- Gear
- Rope
- Spring
- Wheel
- Axle
- Bearings
- Belts
- Seals
- Roller chains
- Link chains
- Rack and pinion
- Fastener
- Key

==== Airfoil ====
Airfoil

- Sail
- Wing
- Rudder
- Flap
- Propeller

== Inventors and designers of machines ==
- Archimedes
- Banū Mūsā
- Joseph Marie Jacquard
- Jerome H. Lemelson
- Leonardo da Vinci
- Thomas Edison
- James Watt

== Machine lists ==
- List of early flying machines
- Outline of robotics

== See also ==
- Outline of robotics
- Outline of automation
- Engineering
- Technology
- Soft Foot
