= Legged robot =

Type of mobile robot

Legged robots are a type of mobile robot which use articulated limbs, such as leg mechanisms, to provide locomotion. They are more versatile than wheeled robots and can traverse many different terrains, though these advantages require increased complexity and power consumption. Legged robots often imitate legged animals, such as humans or insects, in an example of biomimicry.

== Gait and support pattern ==
Legged robots, or walking machines, are designed for locomotion on rough terrain and require control of leg actuators to maintain balance, sensors to determine foot placement and planning algorithms to determine the direction and speed of movement. The periodic contact of the legs of the robot with the ground is called the gait of the walker.

In order to maintain locomotion the center of gravity of the walker must be supported either statically or dynamically. Static support is provided by ensuring the center of gravity is within the support pattern formed by legs in contact with the ground. Dynamic support is provided by keeping the trajectory of the center of gravity located so that it can be repositioned by forces from one or more of its legs.

== Types ==
Legged robots can be categorized by the number of limbs they use, which determines gaits available. Many-legged robots tend to be more stable, while fewer legs lends itself to greater maneuverability.

=== One-legged ===
One-legged, or pogo stick robots use a hopping motion for navigation. In the 1980s, Carnegie Mellon University developed a one-legged robot to study balance. Berkeley's SALTO is another example.

=== Two-legged ===
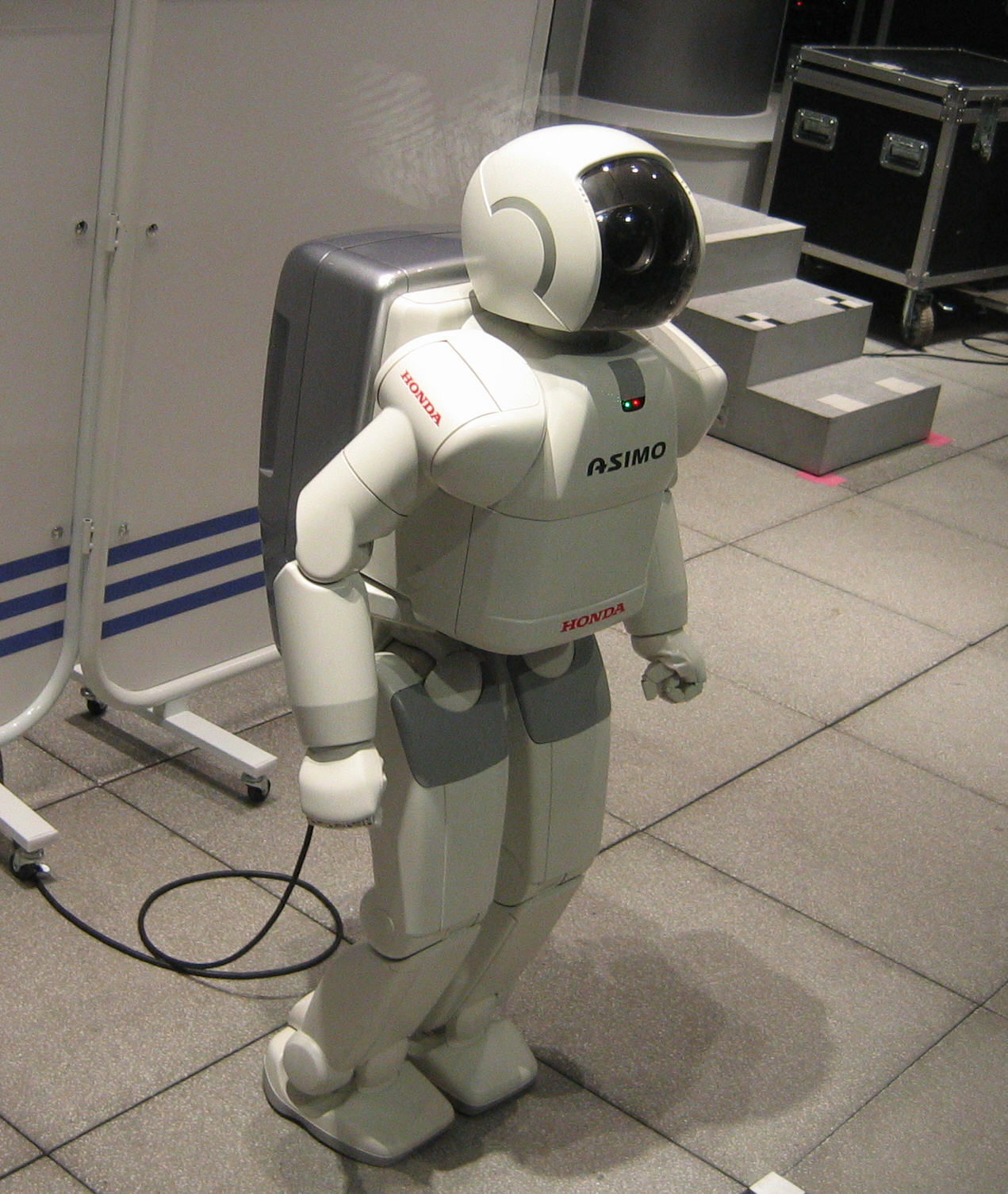
ASIMO - a bipedal robot

Bipedal or two-legged robots exhibit bipedal motion. They face two primary problems:

1. stability control, which refers to a robot's balance, and
2. motion control, which refers to a robot's ability to move.

Stability control is particularly difficult for bipedal systems, which must maintain balance in the forward-backward direction even at rest. Some robots, especially toys, solve this problem with large feet, which provide greater stability while reducing mobility. Alternatively, more advanced systems use sensors such as accelerometers or gyroscopes to provide dynamic feedback in a fashion that approximates a human being's balance. Such sensors are also employed for motion control and walking. The complexity of these tasks lends itself to machine learning.

Simple bipedal motion can be approximated by a rolling polygon where the length of each side matches that of a single step. As the step length grows shorter, the number of sides increases and the motion approaches that of a circle. This connects bipedal motion to wheeled motion as a limit of stride length.

Two-legged robots include:

- Boston Dynamics' Atlas
- Toy robots such as QRIO and ASIMO.
- NASA's Valkyrie robot, intended to aid humans on Mars.
- The ping-pong playing TOPIO robot.

=== Four-legged ===
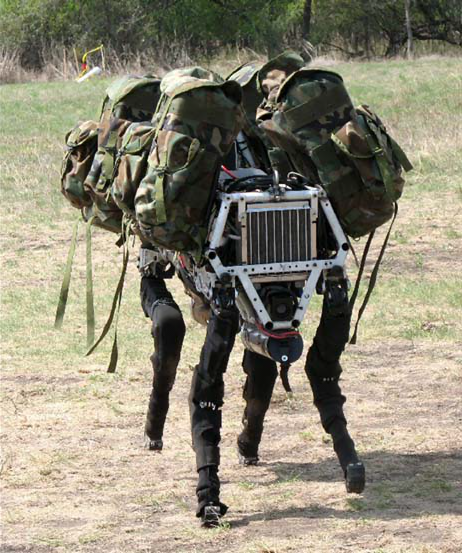
Quadruped robot "BigDog" was being developed as a mule that could traverse difficult terrain.

Quadrupedal or four-legged robots exhibit quadrupedal motion. They benefit from increased stability over bipedal robots, especially during movement. At slow speeds, a quadrupedal robot may move only one leg at a time, ensuring a stable tripod. Four-legged robots also benefit from a lower center of gravity than two-legged systems.

Four legged robots include:

- The TITAN series, developed since the 1980s by the Hirose-Yoneda Laboratory.
- The dynamically stable BigDog, developed in 2005 by Boston Dynamics, NASA's Jet Propulsion Laboratory, and the Harvard University Concord Field Station.
- BigDog's successor, the Legged Squad Support System (LS3).
- Spot by Boston Dynamics
- ANYmal and ANYmal X (the explosion-proof version) by ANYbotics
- MIT's new back flipping mini Cheetah robot
- Aliengo by Unitree Robotics
- Stanford Pupper
- The Open Dynamic Robot Initiative robots with 8DOF and 12DOF
- Botcat-robot with a moving spine
- Cheetah-Cub robot from the Biorobotics Laboratory
- Oncilla robot from the Biorobotics Laboratory(open source)
- Morti robot from the Dynamic Locomotion Group
- Honey Badger by MAB Robotics

=== Six-legged ===
Six-legged robots, or hexapods, are motivated by a desire for even greater stability than bipedal or quadrupedal robots. Their final designs often mimic the mechanics of insects, and their gaits may be categorized similarly. These include:

- Wave gait: the slowest gait, in which pairs of legs move in a "wave" from the back to the front.
- Tripod gait: a slightly faster step, in which three legs move at once. The remaining three legs provide a stable tripod for the robot.

Six-legged robots include:

- LAURON, a six-legged, biologically inspired robot being developed at the FZI Forschungszentrum Informatik in Germany.
- Odex, a 375-pound hexapod developed by Odetics in the 1980s. Odex distinguished itself with its onboard computers, which controlled each leg.
- Genghis, one of the earliest autonomous six-legged robots, was developed at MIT by Rodney Brooks in the 1980s.
- The modern toy series, Hexbug.

=== Eight-legged ===
Eight-legged legged robots are inspired by spiders and other arachnids, as well as some underwater walkers. They are more stable than six-legged robots, which enabled some early successes with legged robots.

Eight-legged robots include:

- Dante, a Carnegie Mellon University project designed to explore Mount Erebus.
- The T8X, a commercially available robot designed to emulate a spider's appearance and movements.

=== Hybrids ===
Some robots use a combination of legs and wheels. This grants a machine the speed and energy efficiency of wheeled locomotion as well as the mobility of legged navigation. Boston Dynamics' Handle, a bipedal robot with wheels on both legs, is one example.

== See also ==
- Boston Dynamics
- Jansen's linkage
- Klann linkage
- Mecha
- Walking vehicle
- Whegs
