= Walking vehicle =

Vehicles that use legs rather than wheels, wings or hulls, for land locomotion

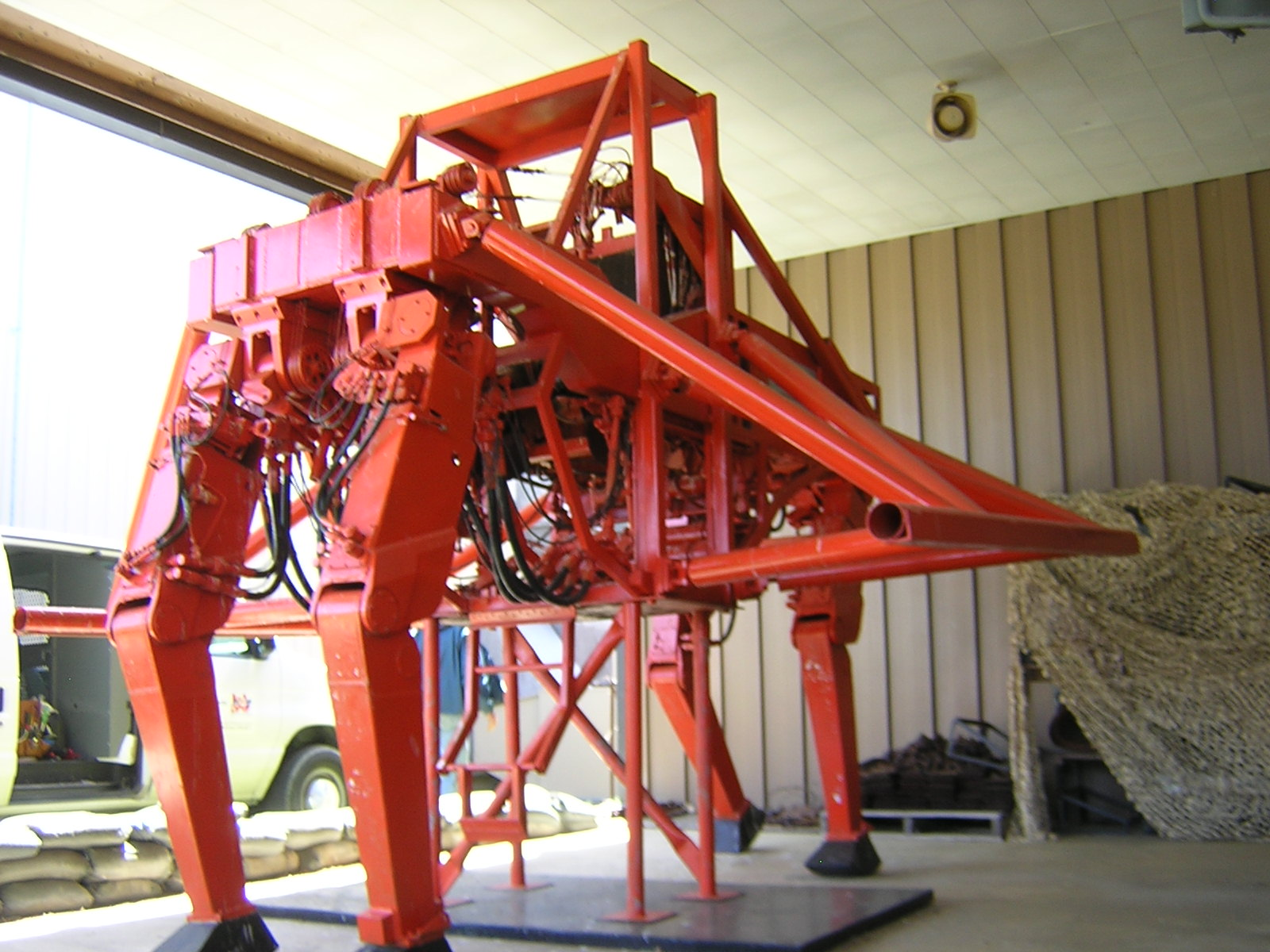
A quadruped walker, the General Electric Walking Truck, on display at the U.S. Army Transportation Museum

A walking vehicle is a vehicle that moves on legs rather than wheels or tracks. Walking vehicles have been constructed with anywhere from one to more than eight legs. There are many designs for the leg mechanisms of walking machines that provide foot trajectories with different properties.

Walking vehicles are classified according to the number of legs. Common configurations are one leg (pogo stick, monopod, unipod, or "hopper"), two legs (biped or bipod), four legs (quadruped), and six legs (hexapod). There are a few prototypes of walking vehicles. Currently almost all of these are experimental or proof of concept.

== Mobility ==
Walking vehicles can provide greater ground clearance than wheeled or tracked vehicles, but the complexity of their leg mechanisms has limited their use. Examples of manned walking vehicles include General Electric's Walking truck, the University of Duisburg-Essen's ALDURO. Timberjack, a subsidiary of John Deere, built a practical hexapod Walking Forest Machine (harvester). In 2012, the Martin Montensano-built 'Walking Beast', a 7-ton vehicle with four hydraulic binary-configuration limbs, which was shown at Burning Man.

== Examples ==
Animated diagram of dragline excavator "walking" based on Oscar Martinson's patent of 1926.

=== Walking dragline excavators ===
Dragline excavators are extremely large and heavy machines used in mining and civil engineering since the 1920s that have used mechanical "walking" for locomotion. Typically, they use a three-legged gait: in each step, a pair of elongated "feet" lift the excavator together with its base and put it back down a short distance forward. Turning is achieved by lifting both "feet" off the ground and pivoting on top of the base in the desired direction.

Big Muskie (1969, 12,000 t) was the largest dragline excavator, and thus the largest walking machine ever built.

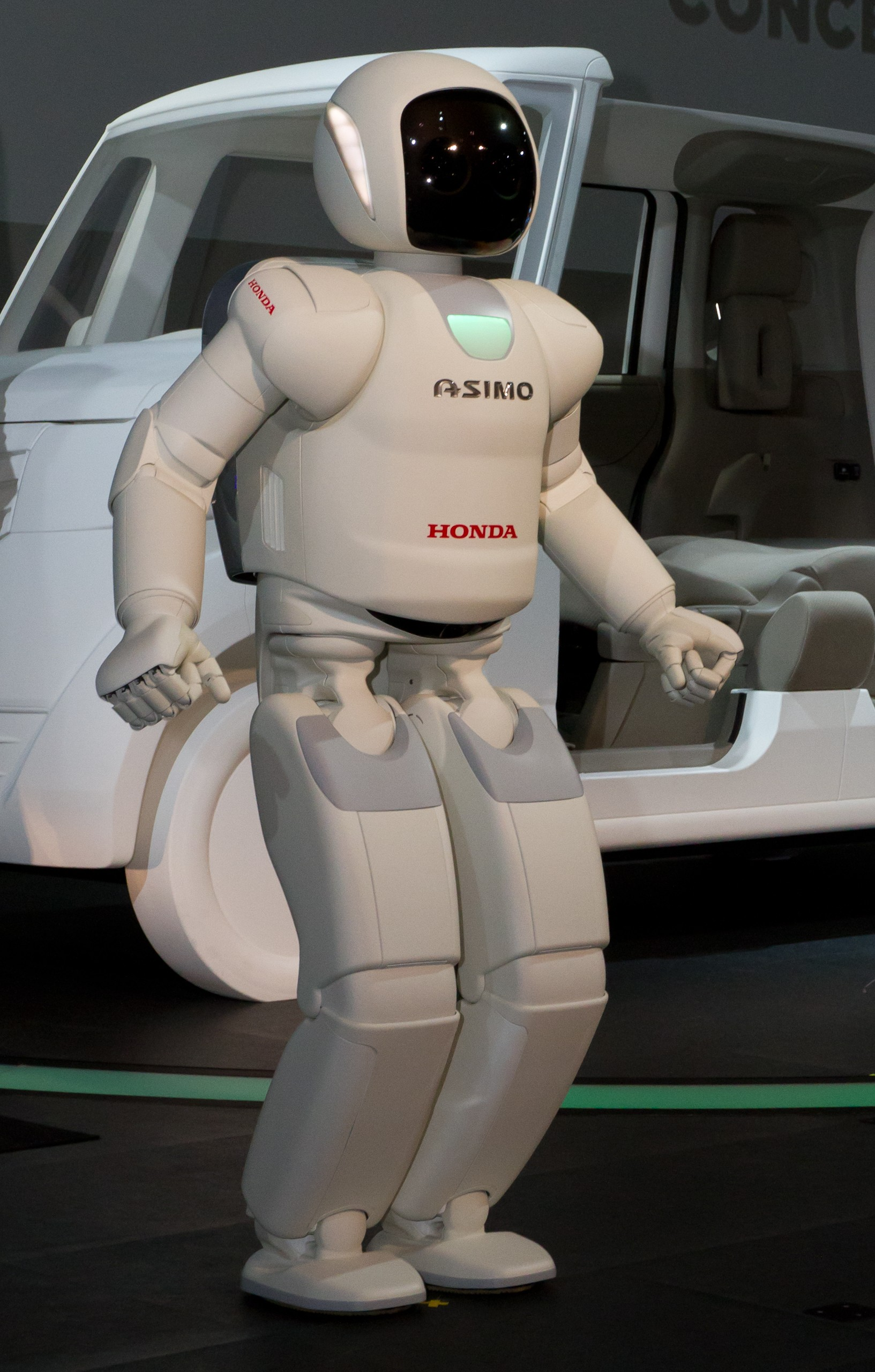
ASIMO (2011 version)

=== Legged robots ===
The landers of the Mars 2 and Mars 3 probes carried small tethered "rovers" that were intended to shuffle on the Martian surface on a pair of skids, similar to a walking dragline excavator. Both landers failed, so the rovers were never deployed on Mars.

Honda has developed a number of humanoid robots that use a bipedal gait, starting with the experimental E series in the mid-1980s and culminating with the autonomous ASIMO, introduced in 2000. ASIMO has inspired a number of similar bipedal toy robots.

Boston Dynamics develops complex walking robots that are capable of moving over rough terrain and avoiding obstacles. The quadruped BigDog was designed for potential military applications.

Traddino, a quadrupedal animatronic dragon created for a German festival, was recognized by the Guinness Book of World Records as the "World's biggest walking robot". It is operated by remote control rather than a pilot.

=== Kinetic sculptures ===
Dutch artist Theo Jansen has created many walking machines called strandbeest that wander on Dutch beaches.

=== Anthropomorphic vehicles ===
At the end of 2016, Korea Future Technology built a prototype of a robot called METHOD-1, that could qualify as a mecha. The robot could walk, and its driver could control the robot's arms individually.

== In media ==
In the Metal Gear franchise, the eponymous "Metal Gear" mecha typically assumes the form of a walking vehicle.

The Star Wars franchise features multiple vehicles known as "walkers", beginning with the All-Terrain Armored Transport featured in The Empire Strikes Back.

In Warhammer: 40,000, the Adeptus Mechanicus faction creates vehicles for the Imperium of Man known "Imperial Titans", who are colossal god machines which come in multiple variants.

In the movie Aliens (1986), main character Ellen Ripley uses a walking vehicle, referred to as the P-5000 Powered Work Loader in a final matchup against the Xenomorph Queen.

== See also ==
- Legged robot
- Mecha
- Powered exoskeleton
