= Mondo spider =

Walking machine

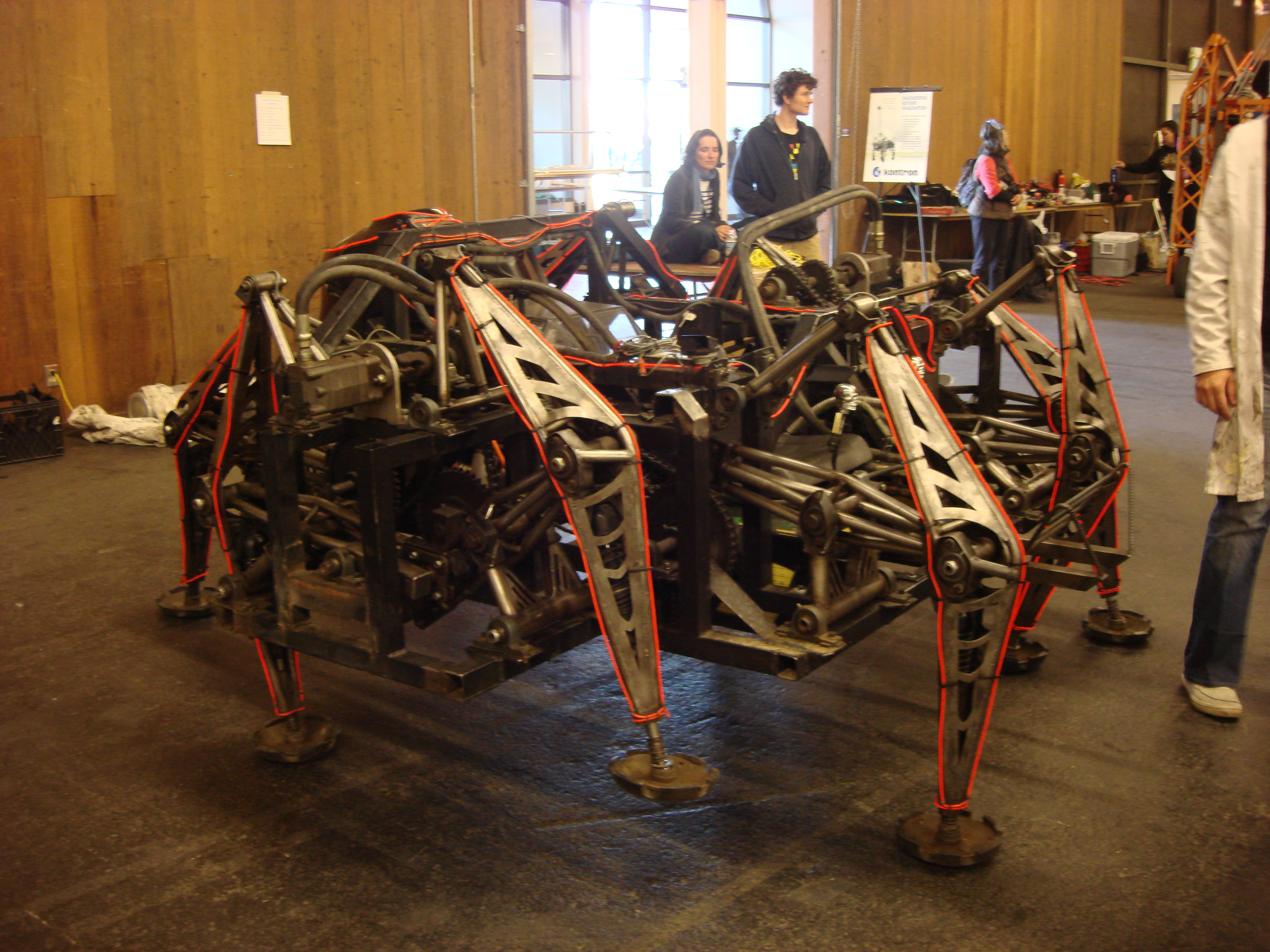
Mondo Spider

The Mondo Spider is a ride-on walking machine propelled via eight steel legs in a walking motion utilizing the Klann Linkage.

It was designed and built in 2005 and 2006 by Leigh Christie, Jonathan Tippet, Charlie Brison, Alex Mossman, Dillard Brinson, Sam Meyer, Ryan Johnston, and Daniel Anderson. Now affiliated with the Vancouver-based charity eatART foundation, the spider has been featured at events such as the Burning Man festival, Vancouver Art Gallery, New York's "Gagettoff" and numerous television appearances.

The first power source was a Honda V-twin engine and a system of hydraulic pumps and motors, which was upgraded in January 2010 as part of the Mondo Spider "0 Emissions" program.

The vehicle has a carrying capacity of one person and a maximum speed of around 4 feet per second (1.2 m/s), a "brisk walking speed".

== History ==
The spider concept was inspired by the Vancouver Junkyard Wars, which were a localised version of the concepts in the TV shows Scrapheap Challenge and Junkyard Wars USA. As part of the 2006 Burning Man festival theme "Hope and Fear" the project received a grant from the Burning Man group to build the mechanical spider for demonstration at the festival.

== Development team ==
The Mondo Spider team consisted of a range of volunteers. The project was the creation of the Vancouver, B.C.-based team of Jon Tippett, the brother of Michael Tippett, Charlie Brinson, Leigh Christie, Brad Buss, Ryan Johnson and Tony Geluch.

== Research and development funding ==
Initial seed funding from Dillard Brinson, the father of one of the team members. A grant from the 2006 Burning Man committee was obtained after a proposal was submitted. The final leg of development was funded by Rob Cunningham which enabled the project to obtain space with Great Northern Way Campus. On the 20 August 2006 the project implementation was presented to the public at a fund-raiser which raised $1,000 towards the project. An industrial design company Industrialus is listed as a project sponsor also.

== Specifications ==
Specifications sourced from the project page

Physical Specifications
Weight:	~1,600 lb (730 kg)
Length:	8 ft (2.4 m)
Width:	8 ft (2.4 m)
Height :	5 ft (1.5 m)
Powerplant and drive train
Engine:	Electrical Drive Train: motor, batteries, controller
Performance
Gross power:	24 hp (18 kW)
Maximum range:	14 km (8.7 mi)
Maximum revs:	3600 rpm

The Mondo spider has eight legs.

== See also ==
- Arachno-Bot
- Hexapod (robotics)
- Kinetic art – Genre of artworks that contains movement
- Leg mechanism – Mechanical system that walks
- Theo Jansen – Dutch artist (born 1948)
