= Klann linkage =

Planar mechanism designed to simulate the gait of legged animals

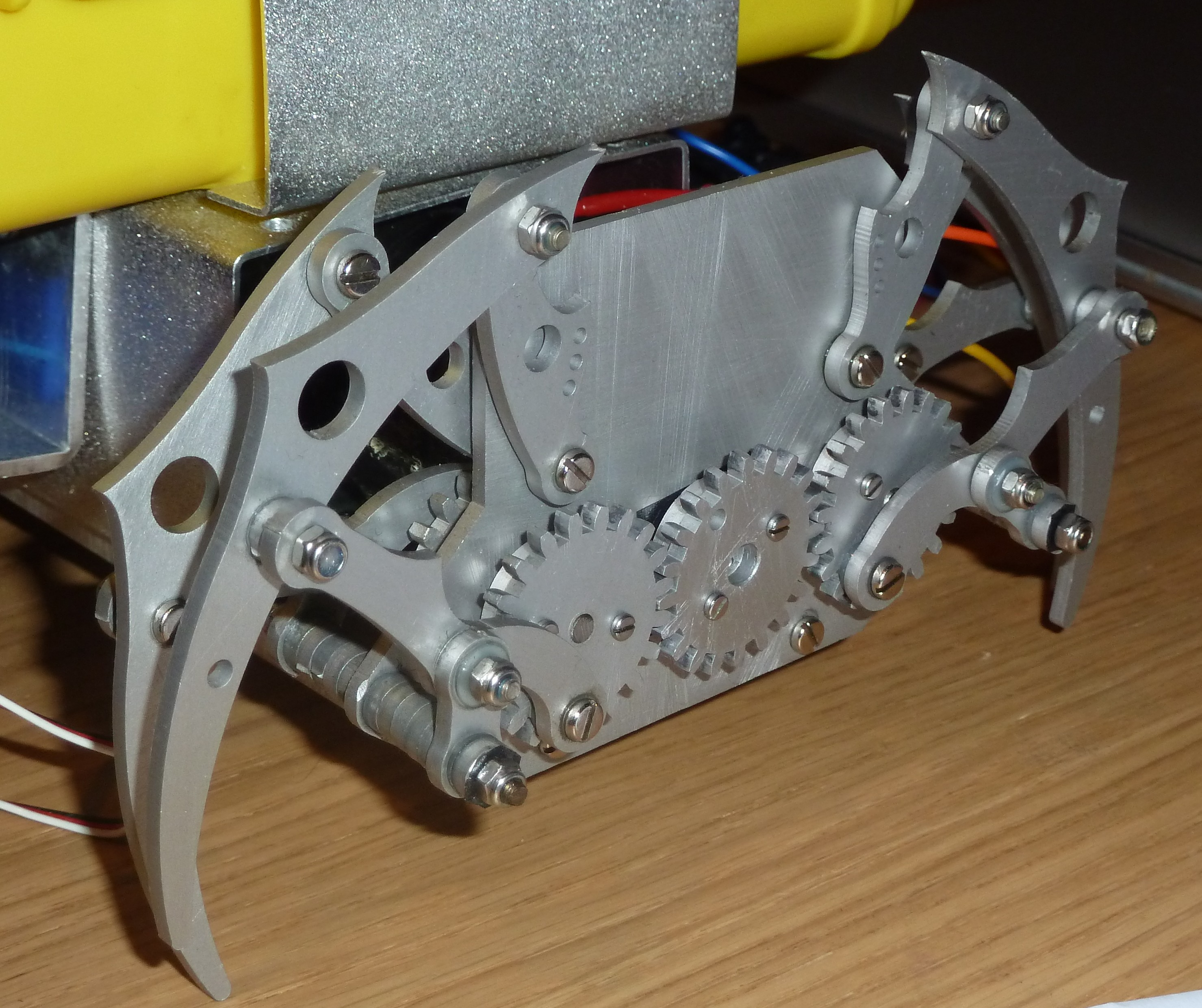
Underwater walking robot, using Klann leg linkages in laser-cut and anodised aluminium.

The Klann linkage is a planar mechanism designed to simulate the gait of legged animal and function as a wheel replacement, a leg mechanism. The linkage consists of the frame, a crank, two grounded rockers, and two couplers all connected by pivot joints. It was developed by Joe Klann in 1994 as an expansion of Burmester curves which are used to develop four-bar double-rocker linkages such as harbor crane booms. It is categorized as a modified Stephenson type III kinematic chain.

The proportions of each of the links in the mechanism are defined to optimize the linearity of the foot for one-half of the rotation of the crank. The remaining rotation of the crank allows the foot to be raised to a predetermined height before returning to the starting position and repeating the cycle. Two of these linkages coupled together at the crank and one-half cycle out of phase with each other will allow the frame of a vehicle to travel parallel to the ground.

The Klann linkage is supposed to provide many of the benefits of more advanced walking vehicles without some of their limitations. It can step over curbs, climb stairs, or travel into areas that are currently not accessible with wheels but does not require microprocessor control or multitudes of actuator mechanisms. It fits into the technological space between these walking devices and axle-driven wheels.

== Mechanism ==
Klann linkage work on the basis of kinematics where all links gives relative motion with each other. It converts the rotatory motion to linear motion, and looks like an animal walking.

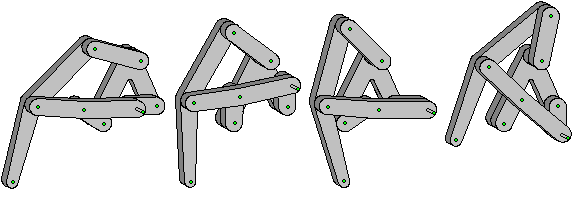
These figures show a single linkage in the fully extended, mid-stride, retracted, and lifted positions of the walking cycle. These four figures show the crank (rightmost link in the first figure on the left with the extended pin) in the 0, 90, 180, and 270 degree positions.

This animation shows the working of a klann mechanism.

This is a repeating animation of the legs in motion with the near legs of each set outlined in blue. A reasonable understanding of the functioning of the linkage can be gained by focusing on a specific point and following it through several cycles. Each of the pivot points is displayed in green. The three positions grounded to the frame for each leg are stationary. The upper and lower rockers move back and forth along a fixed arc and the crank traces out a circle.

Movement paths of each point (in blue is the ground link)

== Comparison with Jansen's linkage ==
Jansen Linkage

The Klann mechanism uses six links per leg, whereas the Jansen's linkage developed by Theo Jansen uses eight links per leg, with one degree of freedom.

== Example leg ==
example leg illustrated

In U.S. patent 6,260,862 there is a set of coordinates for an example leg:

Point	X	Y	Description
Fixpoints
9	1.366	1.366	first rocker arm axle
11	1.009	0.574	second rocker arm axle
15	1.599	0.750	crank shaft
fully extended ground stride position
27X	0.741	0.750	elbow joint
29x	1.331	0.750	crank
33x	0.000	0.000	foot
35x	0.232	0.866	knee joint/axle
37x	0.866	1.500	hip joint
grounded gait position
27Y	1.277	0.750	elbow joint
29y	1.867	0.750	crank
33y	1.000	0.000	foot
35y	0.768	0.866	knee joint/axle
37y	1.000	1.732	hip joint

== See also ==
- Wheel
- Linkage (mechanical)
- Leg mechanism
- Mondo Spider
- Jansen's linkage
- Chebyshev linkage and Chebyshev's Lambda Mechanism
