= How Round Is Your Circle? =

How Round Is Your Circle? Where Engineering and Mathematics Meet
- Authors: John Bryant, Chris Sangwin
- Language: English
- Subject: Mathematics of physical objects
- Publisher: Princeton University Press
- Publication date: 2008
- ISBN: 978-0-691-14992-9

How Round Is Your Circle? Where Engineering and Mathematics Meet is a book on the mathematics of physical objects, for a popular audience. It was written by chemical engineer John Bryant and mathematics educator Chris Sangwin, and published by the Princeton University Press in 2008.

== Topics ==
The book has 13 chapters, whose topics include:

- Lines, the thickness of physically drawn or cut lines, and the problem of testing straightness of physical objects
- The construction of physical measuring and calculating devices including rulers, protractors, pantographs, planimeters, integrators, and slide rules
- Mechanical linkages, pantographs, four-bar linkages, and the problem of converting rotary to linear motion, solved by the Peaucellier–Lipkin linkage and by Hart's inversor
- Geometric dissections, straightedge and compass constructions, angle trisection, and mathematical origami
- The catenary and the tractrix, curves formed from physical forces, and their use in bridges and bearings
- Approximation by rational numbers, discretization and pixelization, gear ratios, and the approximations involved in calendar systems
- The roundness of objects, non-circular objects of constant width, including the Reuleaux triangle and certain coins, and their use in drilling square holes
- Stability and mechanical equilibrium of objects, overhanging objects and the block-stacking problem, supereggs, and objects with only one stable resting position (unfortunately not including the Gömböc, which was discovered too recently to be included)

The book emphasizes the construction of physical models, and includes many plates of the authors' own models, detailed construction plans, and illustrations.

== Audience and reception ==
Doug Manchester characterizes the topic of the book as "recreational engineering". It only requires a standard background in mathematics including basic geometry, trigonometry, and a small amount of calculus. Owen Smith calls it "a great book for engineers and mathematicians, as well as the interested lay person", writing that it is particularly good at laying bare the mathematical foundations of seemingly-simple problems. Similarly, Ronald Huston recommends it to "mathematicians, engineers, and physicists", as well as interested members of the general public.

Matthew Killeya writes approvingly of the book's intuitive explanations for its calculations and the motivation it adds to the mathematics it applies. However, although reviewer Tim Erickson calls the book "exuberant and eclectic", reviewers Andrew Whelan and William Satzer disagree, both finding fault with the book's lack of focus.
