= Leonid Assur =

Russian engineer (1878–1920)

Leonid Vladímirovich Assur
- Леонид Владимирович Ассур
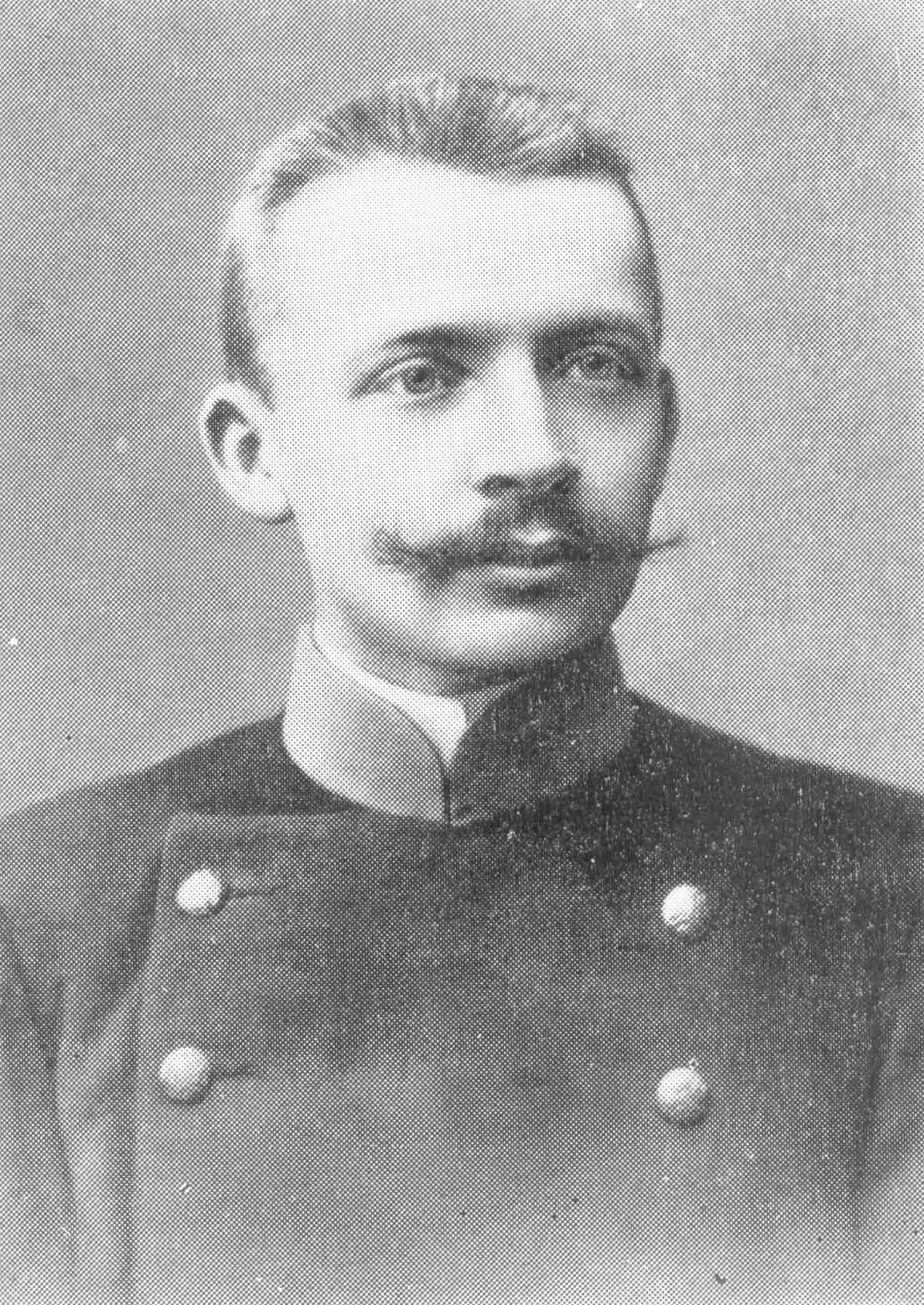
- Born: March 31, 1878; Rybinsk, Empire of Russia
- Died: May 19, 1920 (aged 42); Voronezh, Soviet Union
- Occupation: Engineer

Leonid Vladimirovich Assur (Russian: Леони́д Влади́мирович Ассу́р) (March 31, 1878 – May 19, 1920) was a Russian mechanical engineer and scientist whose works on kinematics and dynamics established the theoretical principles of the Soviet school of Theory of Mechanisms and Machines (TMM).

He created a system for classifying planar linkages, known as the Assur groups, using mechanism theory. This comprehensive system covered existing hinge mechanisms and paved the way for the development of new ones. After Assur's death, his innovative ideas were further developed by other researchers, both in Russia and internationally.

== Biography ==
He was born on March 31, 1878, in Rybinsk, into the family of railroad worker Vladimir Fyodorovich Assur and his wife Lyudmila Andreyevna Assur. He was the eldest of three children. After the death of his mother in 1884, he was sent to receive education in the city of Wesenberg, then part of the Russian Empire, where his aunt Adela Fyodorovna Assur guided his early years of homeschooling. From 1892 to 1896, Leonid lived with distant relatives in Warsaw, where he completed the fourth, fifth, and sixth grades of school with honors. In the autumn of 1895, his father enrolled Leonid in the seventh grade of the Grodno School, from which he graduated in 1897, also being awarded the medal of merit. By the end of school, Leonid already mastered four foreign languages: Latin, Greek, French, and German. He later learned English as well. He played the piano and composed music.

In the autumn of 1897, Leonid Vladimirovich enrolled as a student in the Department of Mathematics at the Faculty of Physics and Mathematics of Moscow University. After completing his studies in 1901 with the degree of Kandidat (not to be confused with the modern Kandidat degree, which was awarded to individuals who completed their undergraduate studies with academic excellence), he followed the path recommended by the prominent engineer Nikolái Zhukovski and applied for admission to the Moscow Technical Institute. As a graduate of the university, he was admitted to the second year of the Mechanics Department at the institute. He completed his studies on August 22, 1906, and obtained the title of Mechanical Engineer.

In April 1906, Leonid Vladimirovich married Elena Mikhaylovna Mindlinaya, who outlived her husband by 40 years. The couple had a son and two daughters. Olga (1907–1909) tragically died in an accident. Their son Vsevolod, born in 1910, became a professor at the Moscow Geodesy Technical Institute. Their daughter Elena, born in 1913, earned a Kandidat degree (equivalent to a PhD) in Physical and Mathematical Sciences and became a lecturer in the Physics Department at the V.N. Obraztsov Leningrad Institute of Railway Engineers.

In 1906, Leonid Vladimirovich, along with his family, moved to St. Petersburg, where he obtained a position as an engineer in the workshops of the municipal bridge service. He directed the preparation of construction and the provision of materials for the construction of several important bridges in the city.

In the fall of 1907, Assur was invited to work as a voluntary contract professor at the Polytechnic Institute of St. Petersburg, teaching mechanical drawing in the Department of Applied Mechanics. From that moment, his life became closely associated with this educational institution. Starting from January 1908, he began to lead practical classes in Theoretical Mechanics, and from 1908 onwards, in Applied Mechanics (which was the term used at that time for the course of Theory of Mechanisms and Machines).

On May 5, 1910, the Scientific Council of the Institute promoted him to a full professor. In the summer of 1910, Assur undertook a study commission abroad, where he had the opportunity to assess the state of teaching Applied Mechanics in technical higher education institutions in Germany.

In 1915, Assur was appointed as the Director of Theoretical and Applied Mechanics exercises at the Polytechnic Institute of St. Petersburg.

On February 13, 1916, in front of the Scientific Council of the Polytechnic Institute, Assur publicly defended his doctoral thesis titled "Study of planar lever mechanisms from the perspective of their structure and classification" («Исследование плоских стержневых механизмов с низшими парами с точки зрения их структуры и классификации») to qualify for the scientific degree of Adjunct (equivalent to the modern PhD degree). The thesis was defended with N.E. Zhukovsky, D.N. Zeylinger, and A.A. Radtsig serving as opponents.

In 1918, Assur was elected Professor emeritus in the Department of Applied Mechanics and Basic Mathematics at the Forestry Institute. In the autumn of that same year, he began teaching master classes at the institute while continuing his classes at the Polytechnic Institute.

Due to the restructuring of the curriculum at the Forestry Institute, during the summer vacation of 1919, L.V. Assur was sent to Voronezh to assess the state of teaching Applied Mechanics and Mathematics in the agricultural institutes of the region. Since the summer of 1917, the Assur family had been living with their mother-in-law. Due to the situation of the Russian Civil War, Leonid Vladimirovich could not return to Petrograd. In these circumstances, he was diagnosed with a peptic ulcer, and on May 19, 1920, he underwent surgery for a duodenal ulcer at a clinic in Voronezh. He died during the operation.

== Scientific activity ==
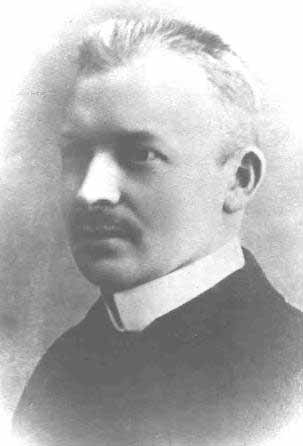
Leonid Assur

Leonid Vladimirovich Assur developed a rational classification of planar mechanisms. He also developed the method of constructing planar mechanisms of any complexity using the superposition of kinematic chains with zero mobility, which were named "Assur groups." He proposed subdividing mechanisms into families, classes, types, orders, etc., providing a comprehensive categorization system.

== Major works ==
L.V. Assur. "On the smoothness of motion of steam engines." Ассур Л.В. "К вопросу о плавности хода паровых машин." Bulletin of the Polytechnic Society, affiliated with the Imperial Technical School. 1906. No. 8. pp. 341–352.

L.V. Assur. "Two theorems of rigid body mechanics and their application to the study of motion in planar mechanisms." Ассур Л.В. "Две теоремы механики твёрдого тела в применении к изучению движения плоских механизмов." Bulletin of the Polytechnic Society, affiliated with the Imperial Technical School. 1907. No. 6. pp. 301–306.

Assur, L. "The method of characteristic curves as a contribution to the graphical evaluation of multiple integrals" Die Methode der charakteristische Kurven, als Beitrag zur graphischen Auswertung mehrfacher Integrale. Zs. f. Math. u. Phys 60, 1–60 (1911).

L.V. Assur. Study of planar lever mechanisms from the perspective of their structure and classification. Ассур Л.В. Исследование плоских стержневых механизмов с низшими парами с точки зрения их структуры и классификации. Moscow: Publishing House of the USSR Academy of Sciences, 1952.

== Bibliography ==
- Artobolevsky I.I. "L.V. Assur and his works on the theory of mechanisms" – In: Trudy po istorii tekhniki, vol. VII. Moscow; Leningrad: Publishing House of the USSR Academy of Sciences, 1954. pp. 3–11. Artobolevsky I.I., Bogolyubov A.N. Leonid Vladimirovich Assur (1878–1920). Moscow: Nauka, 1971. Assur, Leonid Vladimirovich. In: Bolshaya Sovetskaya Entsiklopediya, 3rd edition, 1970, Vol. 2, p. 332. Zhukovsky N.E. "On the mechanism of L.V. Assur." Moscow, 1916.
