= Charles-Nicolas Peaucellier =

French engineer (1832–1919)

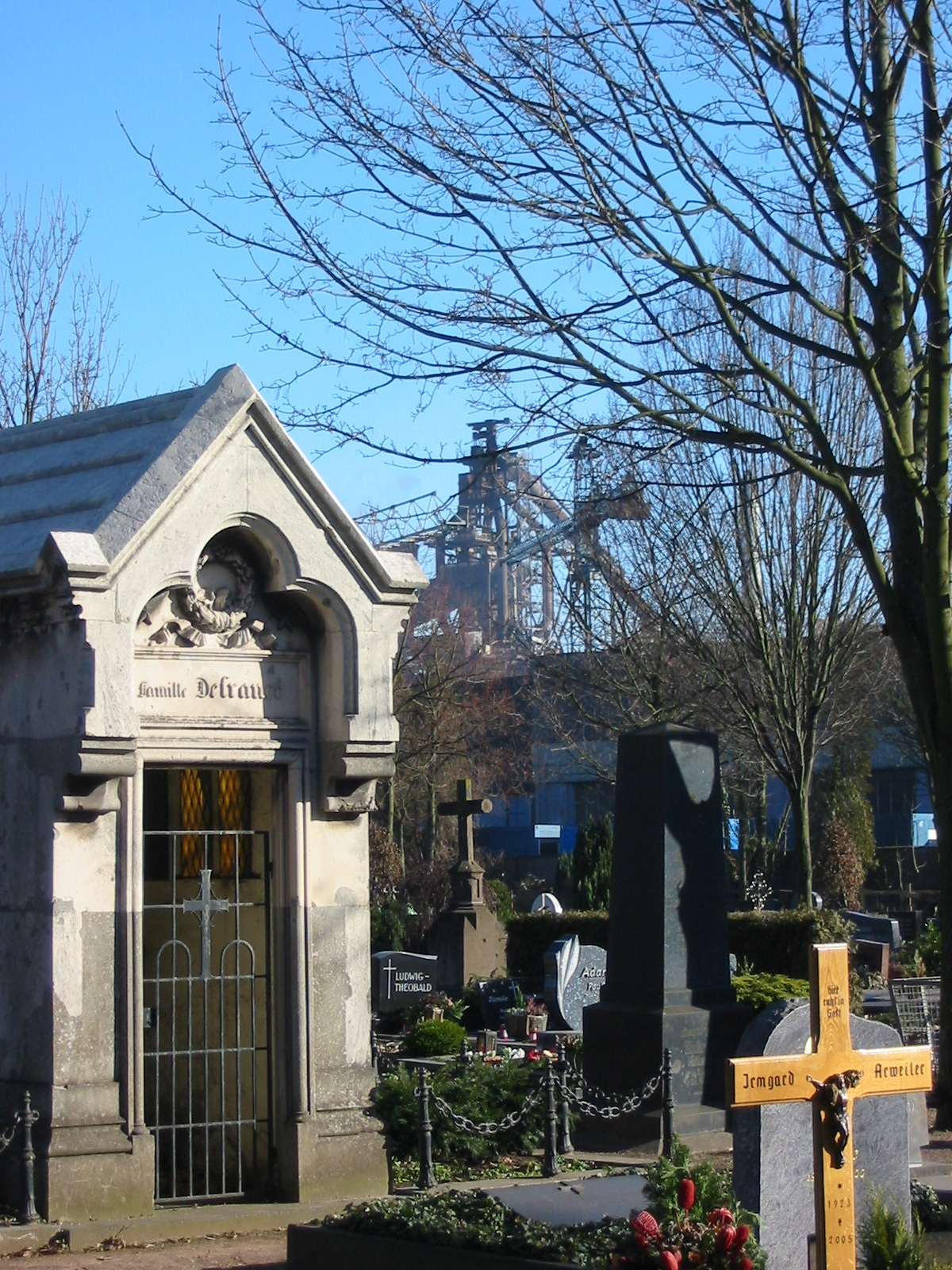
Grave in Dillingen/Saar 1919-1929

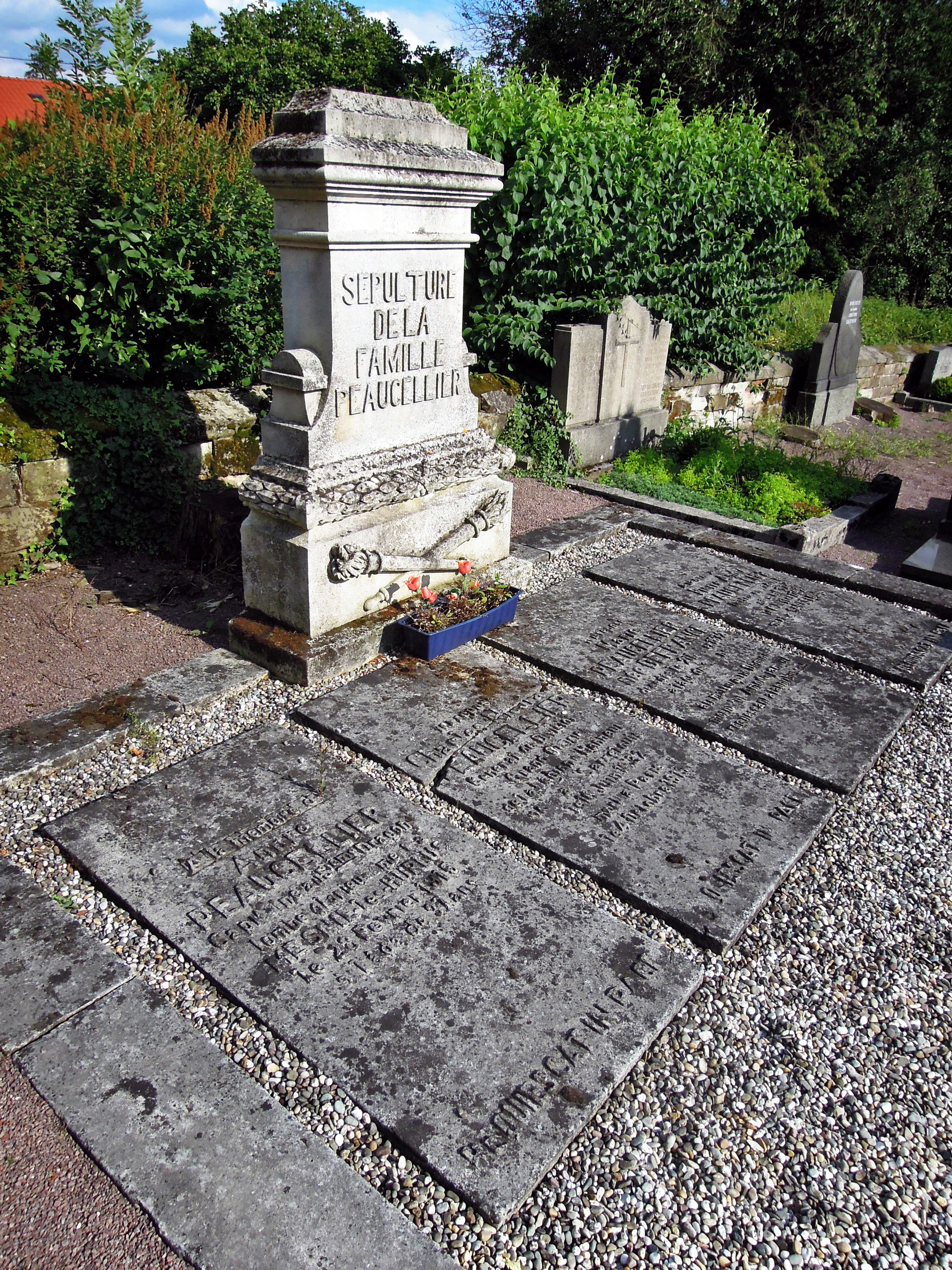
Grave in Wallerfangen since 1929

Charles-Nicolas Peaucellier (16 June 1832 – 4 October 1919) was a French engineer who graduated from the École polytechnique. He made a career in the French army and was promoted to général de division in 1888.

He is best known for the Peaucellier–Lipkin linkage which was partly named after him.
