= Assur group =

Kinematic chain with zero mobility; removal from a mechanism does not change DoF

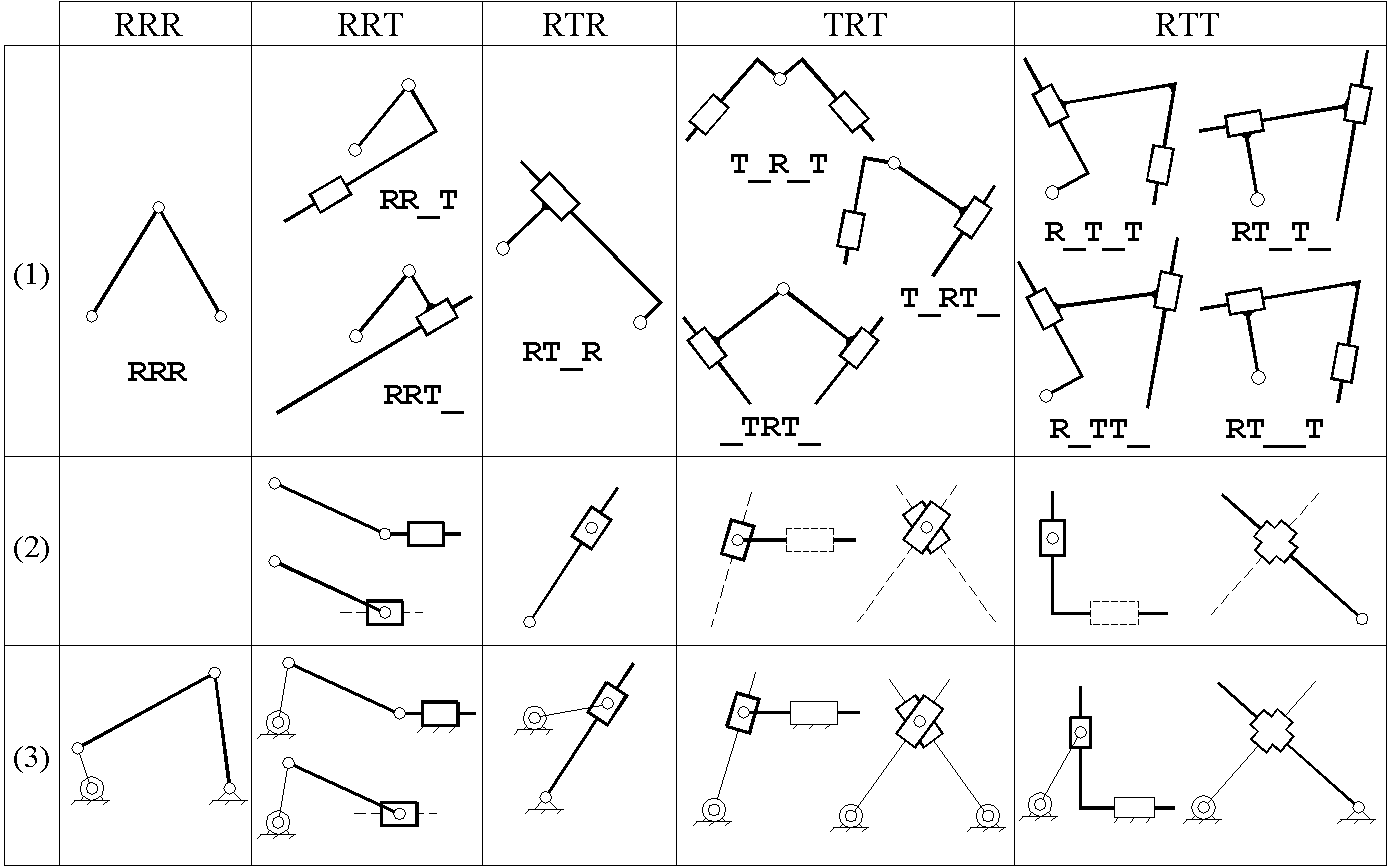
All possible Assur dyadic isomers (1), their simplified embodiment (2), and representative applications (3).

In kinematics, an Assur group is a kinematic chain with zero degree of mobility, which added or subtracted from a mechanism do not alter its original number of degrees of freedom. They have been first described by the Russian engineer Leonid Assur (1878–1920) in 1914.

The simplest of all Assur groups (also known as dyads) have two links and three joints, of which two are potential joints. Using an underscore "_" to indicate a guide following or preceding a slider in a translating (prismatic) joint, all possible dyadic isomers will be: RRR, RR_T, RRT_, RT_R, T_R_T, T_RT_, _TRT_, R_T_T, R_T_T, RT_T_, R_TT_ and RT__T.

Higher order Assur groups are known such as simple and multiple triads, simple and multiple thertad, pentad hexad etc.

When an Assur group is connected to the same link, zero degree-of-freedom entities known as Baranov trusses are obtained.

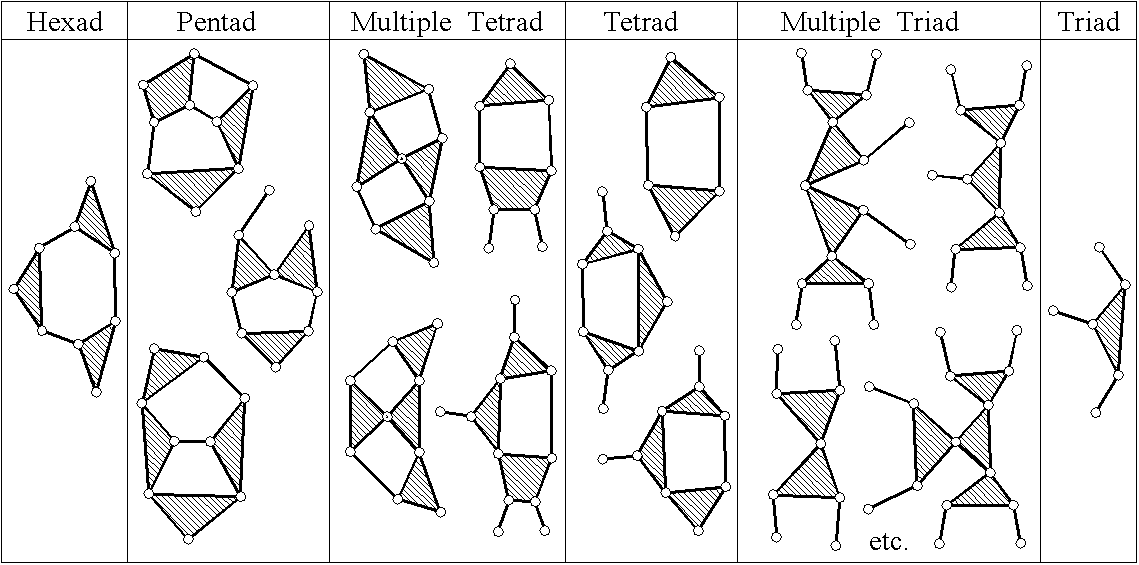
Higher order Assur groups.

== See also ==
- Kinematics
- Kinematic chain
- Kinematic pairs
- Four-bar linkage
