= Yom Tov Lipman Lipkin =

Lithuanian Jewish mathematician (1846–1875)

- Born: 1846; Salantai
- Died: February 21 [O.S. February 9] 1875; Saint Petesburg, Russian Empire
- Education: Jena University
- Occupations: Mathematician, inventor

Yom Tov Lipman Lipkin (Hebrew: יום טוב ליפמן ליפקין, Russian: Липман Израилевич Липкин; 1846 – February 21 [O.S. February 9] 1875) was a Lithuanian Jewish mathematician and inventor. He was the youngest son of Rabbi Yisroel Salanter, the father of the Musar movement.

Lipkin is best known for the Peaucellier–Lipkin linkage which was partly named after him. The device is also known as the "Lipkin parallelogram". Lipkin discovered the linkage independent from Peaucellier in 1871. A model of Lipkin's invention was exhibited at the exposition at Vienna in 1873, and was later secured from the inventor by the Museum of the Institute of Engineers of Ways of Communication, St. Petersburg.

== Biography ==
Lipkin was born in Salantai, department of Kovno, in 1846. He became interested in science and mathematics since childhood. Not knowing any non-Jewish languages, he had to derive his information from Hebrew books alone. He later learned German and French and went to study at University of Königsberg at the age of 17. He received a Ph.D. degree at Jena University with a thesis titled "Ueber die Räumlichen Strophoiden." He then moved to St. Petersburg, to work at University of St. Petersburg and continue his studies under Pafnuty Chebyshev. Soon afterwards he died in 1875 from smallpox.

Lipkin broke from traditional Jewish life, but kept interests in Jewish affairs and published in Ha-Tsefirah newspaper.
