= Leg mechanism =

Mechanical system that walks

Theo Jansen's Strandbeest, a group of planar walking mechanisms

A leg mechanism (walking mechanism) is a mechanical system designed to provide a propulsive force by intermittent frictional contact with the ground. This is in contrast with wheels or continuous tracks which are intended to maintain continuous frictional contact with the ground. Mechanical legs are linkages that can have one or more actuators, and can perform simple planar or complex motion. Compared to a wheel, a leg mechanism is potentially better fitted to uneven terrain, as it can step over obstacles.

An early design for a leg mechanism called the Plantigrade Machine by Pafnuty Chebyshev was shown at the Exposition Universelle (1878). The original engravings for this leg mechanism are available. The design of the leg mechanism for the Ohio State Adaptive Suspension Vehicle (ASV) is presented in the 1988 book Machines that Walk. In 1996, W-B. Shieh presented a design methodology for leg mechanisms.

The artwork of Theo Jansen, see Jansen's linkage, has been particularly inspiring for the design of leg mechanisms, as well as the Klann patent, which is the basis for the leg mechanism of the Mondo Spider.

== Design goals ==
- horizontal speed as constant as possible while touching the ground (support phase)
- while the foot is not touching the ground, it should move as fast as possible
- constant torque/force input (or at least no extreme spikes/changes)
- stride height (enough for clearance, not too much to conserve energy)
- the foot has to touch the ground for at least half of the cycle for a two/four leg mechanism or respectively, a third of the cycle for a three/six leg mechanism
- minimized moving mass
- vertical center of mass always inside the base of support
- the speed of each leg or group of legs should be separately controllable for steering
- the leg mechanism should allow forward and backward walking

Another design goal can be, that stride height and length etc. can be controlled by the operator. This can relatively easily be achieved with a hydraulic leg mechanism, but is not practicable with a crank-based leg mechanism.

The optimization has to be done for the whole vehicle – ideally the force/torque variation during a rotation should cancel each other out.

== History ==
Richard Lovell Edgeworth tried in 1770 to construct a machine he called a "Wooden Horse", but was not successful.

== Patents ==
Patents for leg mechanism designs range from rotating cranks to four-bar and six-bar linkages. See for example the following patents:

- U.S. Patent No. 469,169 Figure Toy, F. O. Norton (1892).
- U.S. Patent No. 1,146,700, Animated Toy, A. Gund (1915). A leg mechanism formed by an inverted slider-crank.
- U.S. Patent No. 1,363,460, Walking Toy, J. A. Ekelund (1920). A leg mechanism formed by a rotating crank with extensions that contact the ground.
- U.S. Patent No. 1,576,956, Quadruped Walking Mechanism, E. Dunshee (1926). A four-bar leg mechanism that shows the coupler curve forms the foot trajectory.
- U.S. Patent No. 1,803,197, Walking Toy, P. C. Marie (1931). Another rotating crank leg mechanism.
- U.S. Patent No. 1,819,029, Mechanical Toy Horse, J. St. C. King (1931). A crank-rocker leg mechanism with a one-way friction mechanisms in the foot.
- U.S. Patent No. 2,591,469, Animated Mechanical Toy, H. Saito (1952). An inverted slider crank mechanism for the front foot and crank-rocker for the back foot.
- U.S. Patent No. 4095661, Walking Work Vehicle, J. R. Sturges (1978). A lambda mechanism combined with a parallelogram linkage to form a translating leg that follows the coupler curve.
- U.S. Patent No. 6,260,862, Walking Device, J. C. Klann (2001). The coupler curve of a four-bar linkage guides the lower link of an RR serial chain to form a leg mechanism, known as the Klann linkage.
- U.S. Patent No. 6,481,513, Single Actuator per Leg Robotic Hexapod, M. Buehler et al. (2002). A leg mechanism that consists of a single rotating crank.
- U.S. Patent No. 6,488,560, Walking Apparatus, Y. Nishikawa (2002). Another rotating crank leg mechanism.

== Gallery ==
=== Stationary ===
Jansen linkage

Klann linkage

Eight-bar leg mechanism

Tokyo Institute of Technology walking chair

Strandbeest (applied Jansen linkage)

Ghassaei Linkage

Tchebyshevs plantigrade machine

TrotBot Linkage (without heel linkage)

TrotBot Linkage Speed Variability as Ground Height Changes

Strider Linkage Speed Variability as Ground Height Changes

Strider Linkage

Foot-Paths of Strandbeest, TrotBot, Strider and Klann Linkages

=== Walking ===
*	4 legs	6 legs
Strandbeest
Ghassaei
Klann linkage 1
Klann linkage 2
Plantigrade Mechanism
Trotbot
Strider Linkage	Strider Prototype, 4 legs/side

== Complex mechanism ==
Shown above are only planar mechanisms, but there are also more complex mechanisms:

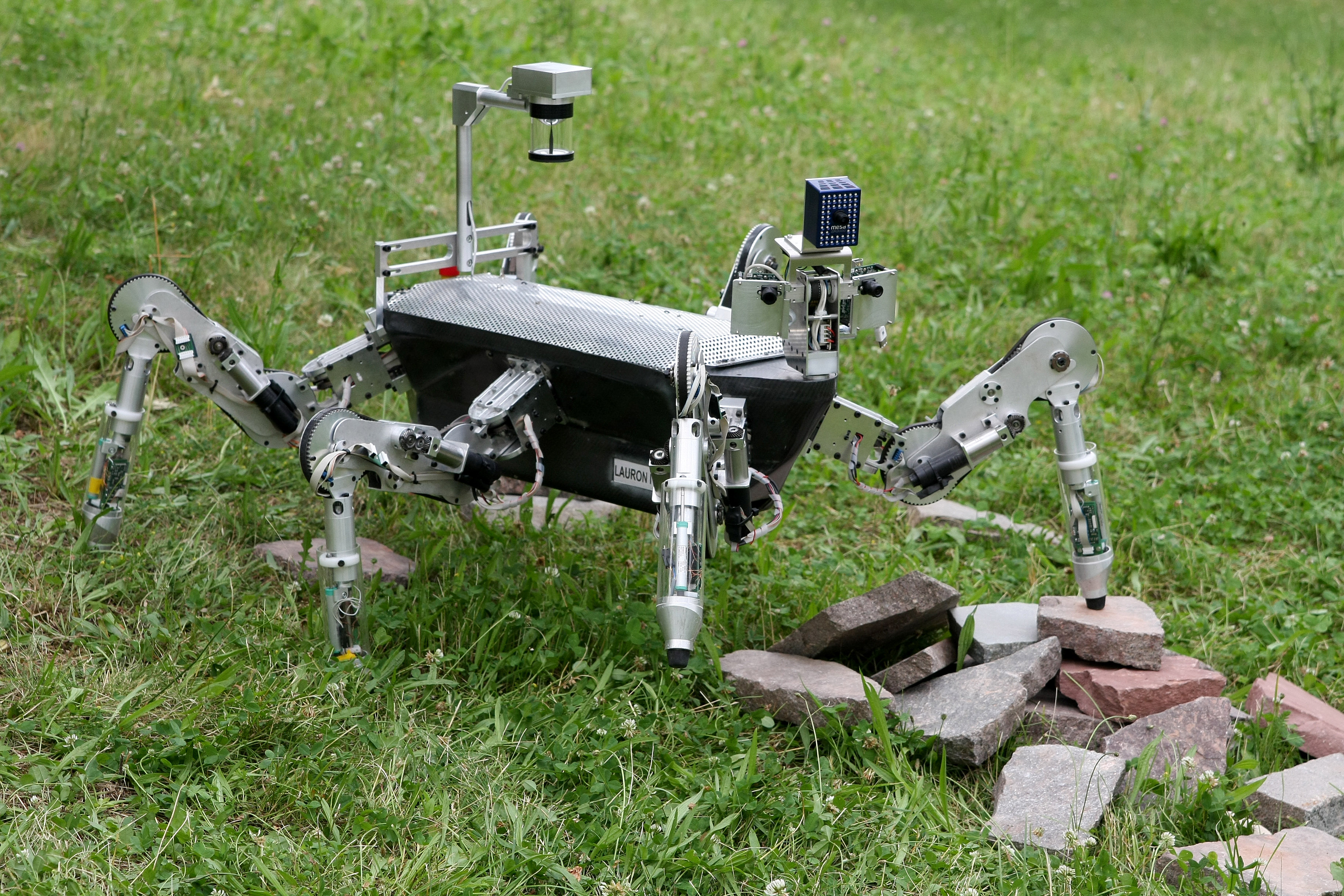

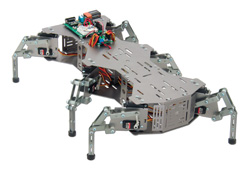

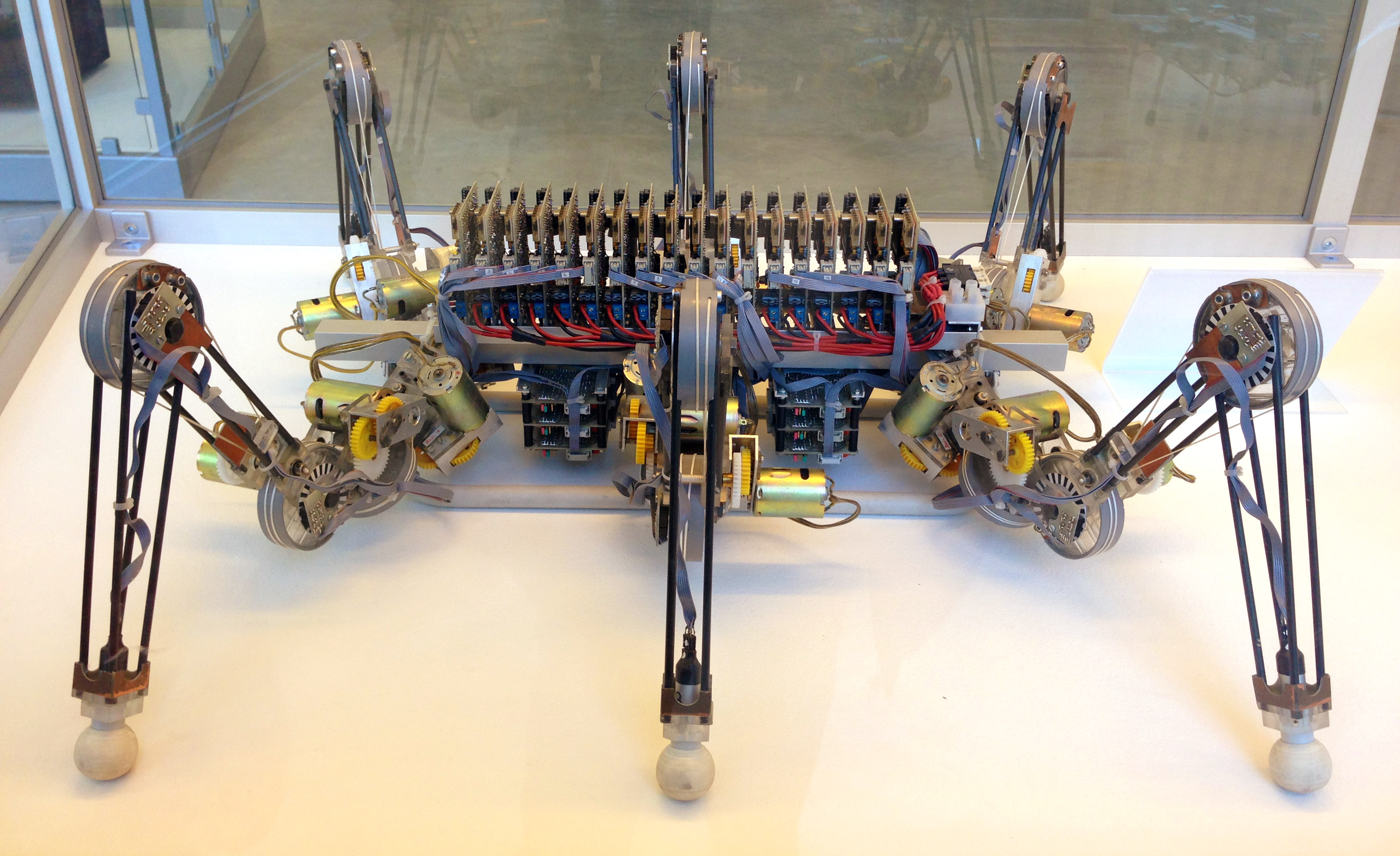

== See also ==
- Hexapod (robotics)
- Jansen's linkage
- Kinematics
- Kinematic pairs
- Klann linkage
- Chebyshev's Lambda Mechanism
- Linkage (mechanical)
- Machine
- Mecha
- Mobile robot
