= Peaucellier–Lipkin linkage =

Mechanical linkage transforming rotary motion into linear

Animation for Peaucellier–Lipkin linkage: Dimensions: Cyan Links = a Green Links = b Yellow Links = c

The Peaucellier–Lipkin linkage (or Peaucellier–Lipkin cell, or Peaucellier–Lipkin inversor), invented in 1864, was the first true planar straight-line mechanism – the first planar linkage capable of transforming rotary motion into perfect straight-line motion, and vice versa. It is named after Charles-Nicolas Peaucellier (1832–1913), a French army officer, and Yom Tov Lipman Lipkin (1846–1876), a Lithuanian Jewish mathematician and son of the famed Rabbi Israel Salanter.

Until this invention, no planar method existed of converting exact straight-line motion to circular motion without reference guideways. In 1864, all power came from steam engines, a steam engine having a piston moving in a straight line within a cylinder. This piston needed to keep a good seal with the cylinder in order to retain the driving medium and not lose energy efficiency due to leaks. The piston does this by remaining perpendicular to the axis of the cylinder, retaining its straight-line motion. Converting the straight-line motion of the piston into circular motion was of critical importance. Most, if not all, applications of these steam engines were rotary.

The mathematics of the Peaucellier–Lipkin linkage is directly related to the inversion of a circle.

== Earlier Sarrus linkage ==
There is an earlier straight-line mechanism, whose history is not well known, called the Sarrus linkage. This linkage predates the Peaucellier–Lipkin linkage by 11 years and consists of a series of hinged rectangular plates, two of which remain parallel but can be moved normally to each other. Sarrus' linkage is of a three-dimensional class sometimes known as a space crank, unlike the Peaucellier–Lipkin linkage, which is a planar mechanism.

== Geometry ==
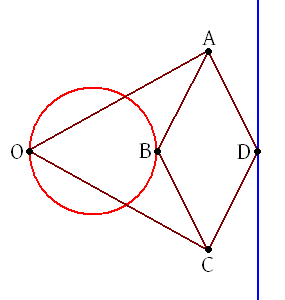
Geometric diagram of a Peaucellier linkage

In the geometric diagram of the apparatus, six bars of fixed length can be seen: O̅A̅, O̅C̅, A̅B̅, B̅C̅, C̅D̅, D̅A̅. The length of O̅A̅ is equal to the length of O̅C̅, and the lengths of A̅B̅, B̅C̅, C̅D̅, and D̅A̅ are all equal, forming a rhombus. Also, point O is fixed. Then, if point B is constrained to move along a circle (for example, by attaching it to a bar with a length halfway between O and B; path shown in red) which passes through O, then point D will necessarily have to move along a straight line (shown in blue). In contrast, if point B were constrained to move along a line (not passing through O), then point D would necessarily have to move along a circle (passing through O).

Many different overall proportions of this linkage are possible. Since points O, B, D must be collinear at all points in the linkage's motion, and countless arm length combinations are viable, then mirror symmetry across O̅B̅D̅ isn't necessary. With O̅B̅D̅ staying collinear, the only requirement to achieve the intended straight-line motion of D are that A̅B̅ = A̅D̅, that B̅C̅ = D̅C̅, and for B to be constrained to a circular path which crosses O. Otherwise, there is no fixed relationship between the lengths of the sides of the ABCD figure, the radius of the constraining circular path of B, and the lengths of O̅A̅ or O̅C̅.

== Mathematical proof of concept ==
=== Collinearity ===
First, it must be proven that points O, B, D are collinear. This may be easily seen by observing that the linkage is mirror-symmetric about line OD, so point B must fall on that line.

More formally, triangles △BAD and △BCD are congruent because side B̅D̅ is congruent to itself, side B̅A̅ is congruent to side B̅C̅ , and side A̅D̅ is congruent to side C̅D̅ . Therefore, angles ∠ABD and ∠CBD are equal.

Next, triangles △OBA and △OBC are congruent, since sides O̅A̅ and O̅C̅ are congruent, side O̅B̅ is congruent to itself, and sides B̅A̅ and B̅C̅ are congruent. Therefore, angles ∠OBA and ∠OBC are equal.

Finally, because they form a complete circle, we have

$$\angle OBA + \angle ABD + \angle DBC + \angle CBO = 360^\circ$$

but, due to the congruences, ∠OBA = ∠OBC and ∠DBA = ∠DBC, thus

$$\begin{align}
& 2 \times \angle OBA + 2 \times \angle DBA = 360^\circ \\
& \angle OBA + \angle DBA = 180^\circ
\end{align}$$

therefore points O, B, and D are collinear.

=== Inverse points ===
Let point P be the intersection of lines AC and BD. Then, since ABCD is a rhombus, P is the midpoint of both line segments B̅D̅ and A̅C̅. Therefore, length B̅P̅ = length P̅D̅.

Triangle △BPA is congruent to triangle △DPA, because side B̅P̅ is congruent to side D̅P̅, side A̅P̅ is congruent to itself, and side A̅B̅ is congruent to side A̅D̅ . Therefore, angle ∠BPA = angle ∠DPA. But since ∠BPA + ∠DPA = 180°, then 2 × ∠BPA = 180°, ∠BPA = 90°, and ∠DPA = 90°.

Let:

$$\begin{align}
& x = \ell_{BP} = \ell_{PD} \\
& y = \ell_{OB} \\
& h = \ell_{AP}
\end{align}$$

Then:

$$\ell_{OB}\cdot \ell_{OD}=y(y+2x)=y^2+2xy$$
${\ell_{OA}}^2 = (y + x)^2 + h^2$ (due to the Pythagorean theorem)
${\ell_{OA}}^2 = y^2 + 2xy + x^2 + h^2$(same expression expanded)
${\ell_{AD}}^2 = x^2 + h^2$ (Pythagorean theorem)
$${\ell_{OA}}^2 - {\ell_{AD}}^2 = y^2 + 2xy = \ell_{OB} \cdot \ell_{OD}$$

Since O̅A̅ and A̅D̅ are both fixed lengths, then the product of O̅B̅ and O̅D̅ is a constant:

$$\ell_{OB}\cdot \ell_{OD} = k^2$$

and since points O, B, D are collinear, then D is the inverse of B with respect to the circle (O,k) with center O and radius k.

=== Inversive geometry ===
Thus, by the properties of inversive geometry, since the figure traced by point D is the inverse of the figure traced by point B, if B traces a circle passing through the center of inversion O, then D is constrained to trace a straight line. But if B traces a straight line not passing through O, then D must trace an arc of a circle passing through O. Q.E.D.

=== A typical driver ===
Slider-rocker four-bar acts as the driver of the Peaucellier–Lipkin linkage

Peaucellier–Lipkin linkages (PLLs) may have several inversions. A typical example is shown in the opposite figure, in which a rocker-slider four-bar serves as the input driver. To be precise, the slider acts as the input, which in turn drives the right grounded link of the PLL, thus driving the entire PLL.

=== Historical notes ===
Sylvester (Collected Works, Vol. 3, Paper 2) writes that when he showed a model to Kelvin, he “nursed it as if it had been his own child, and when a motion was made to relieve him of it, replied ‘No! I have not had nearly enough of it—it is the most beautiful thing I have ever seen in my life.’”

== Cultural references ==
A monumental-scale sculpture implementing the linkage in illuminated struts is on permanent exhibition in Eindhoven, Netherlands. The artwork measures 22 by 15 by 16 metres (72 ft × 49 ft × 52 ft), weighs 6,600 kilograms (14,600 lb), and can be operated from a control panel accessible to the general public.

== See also ==
- Linkage (mechanical)
- Straight line mechanism

== Bibliography ==
- Ogilvy, C. S. (1990), Excursions in Geometry, Dover, pp. 46–48, ISBN 0-486-26530-7
- Bryant, John; Sangwin, Chris (2008). How round is your circle? : where engineering and mathematics meet. Princeton: Princeton University Press. pp. 33–38, 60–63. ISBN 978-0-691-13118-4. — proof and discussion of Peaucellier–Lipkin linkage, mathematical and real-world mechanical models
- Coxeter HSM, Greitzer SL (1967). Geometry Revisited. Washington: MAA. pp. 108–111. ISBN 978-0-88385-619-2. (and references cited therein)
- Hartenberg, R.S. & J. Denavit (1964) Kinematic synthesis of linkages, pp 181–5, New York: McGraw–Hill, weblink from Cornell University.
- Johnson RA (1960). Advanced Euclidean Geometry: An elementary treatise on the geometry of the triangle and the circle (reprint of 1929 edition by Houghton Mifflin ed.). New York: Dover Publications. pp. 46–51. ISBN 978-0-486-46237-0.
- Wells D (1991). The Penguin Dictionary of Curious and Interesting Geometry. New York: Penguin Books. p. 120. ISBN 0-14-011813-6.
