= Jansen's linkage =

Planar leg mechanism

Theo Jansen's linkage. When the blue line at the right end of the picture is driven in a clockwise rotary motion, the leg (blue triangle at the bottom) executes a walking motion. Relative (dimensionless) proportions shown.

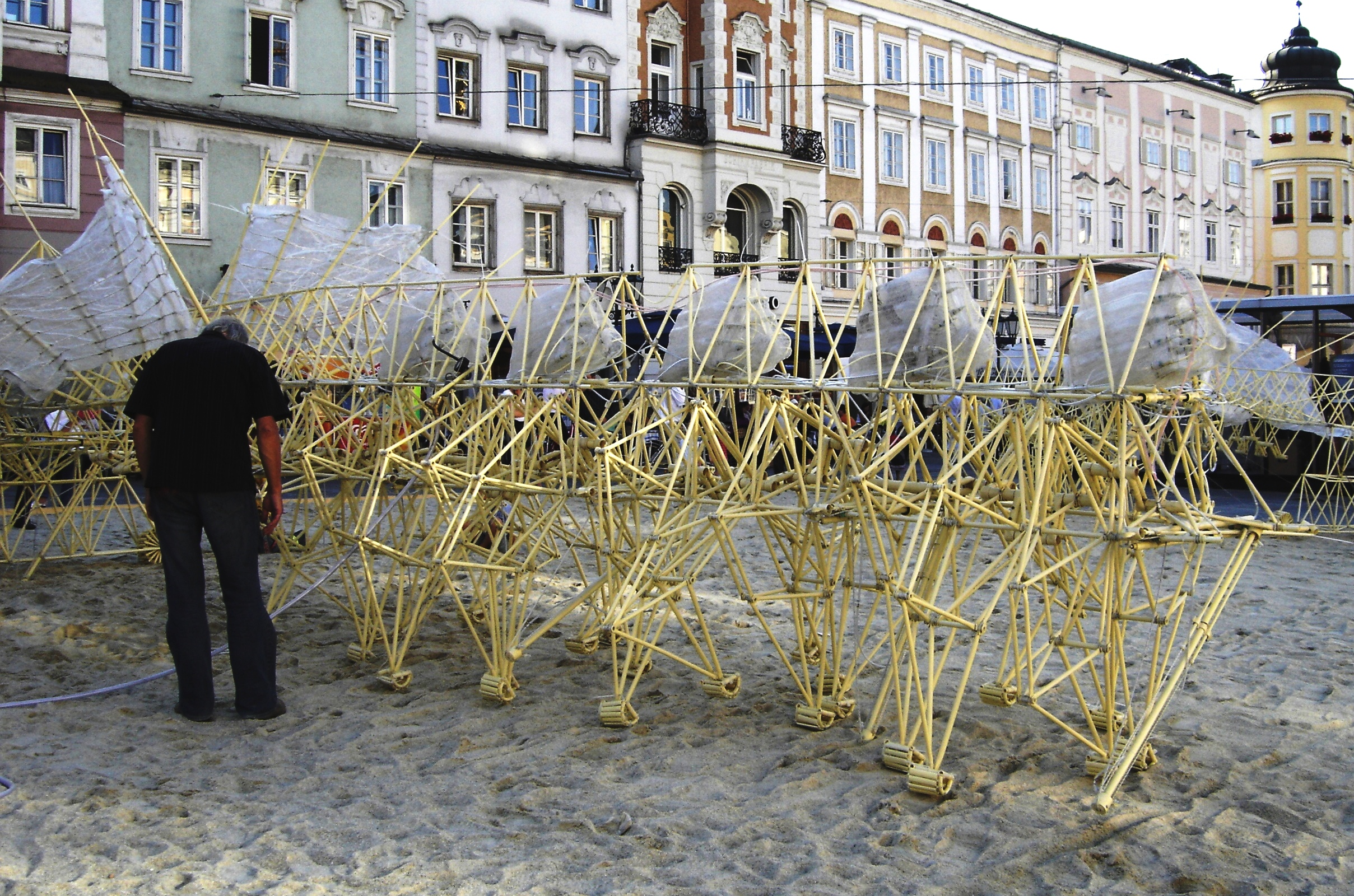
Theo Jansen's kinetic sculpture Strandbeest. A wind-driven walking machine.

A Strandbeest in action

Jansen's linkage is a planar leg mechanism designed by the kinetic sculptor Theo Jansen to generate a smooth walking motion. Jansen has used his mechanism in a variety of kinetic sculptures which are known as Strandbeesten (Dutch for "beach beasts"). Jansen's linkage bears artistic as well as mechanical merit for its simulation of organic walking motion using a simple rotary input. These leg mechanisms have applications in mobile robotics and in gait analysis.

The central 'crank' link moves in circles as it is actuated by a rotary actuator such as an electric motor. All other links and pin joints are unactuated and move because of the motion imparted by the crank. Their positions and orientations are uniquely defined by specifying the crank angle; hence the mechanism has only one degree of freedom (1-DoF). The kinematics and dynamics of the Jansen mechanism have been exhaustively modeled using circle intersection method and bond graphs (Newton–Euler mechanics). These models can be used to rate the actuator torque and in design of the hardware and controller for such a system.

Jansen Linkage Ratios
Segment	a	b	c	d	e	f	g	h	i	j	k	l	m
Value	38	41.5	39.3	40.1	55.8	39.4	36.7	65.7	49	50	61.9	7.8	15.0

== Illustrations ==
Animation of one leg

Length of the rods

Animation of six legs
