= Theo Jansen =

Dutch artist (born 1948)

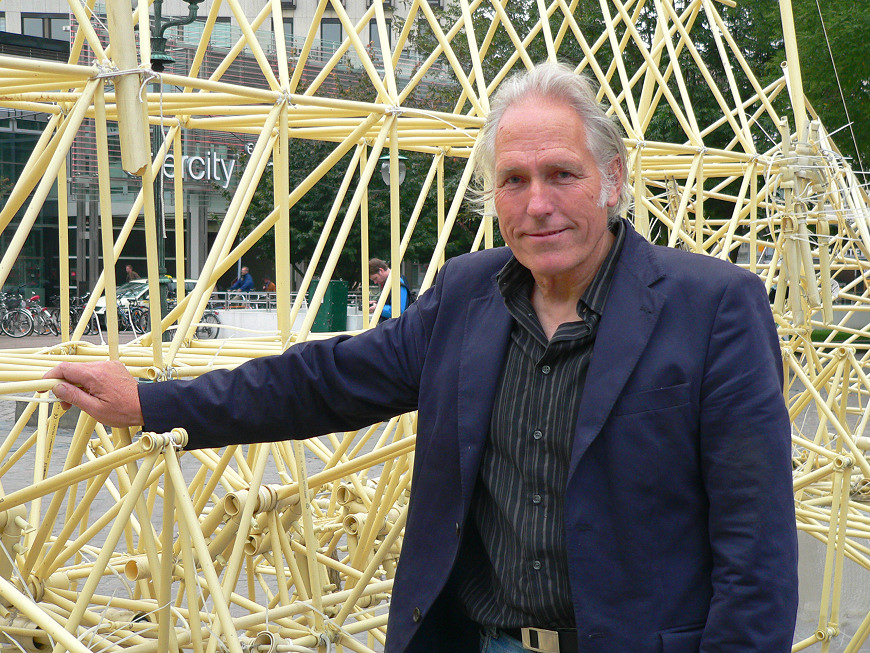
- Jansen in 2007
- Born: 14 March 1948 (age 78); Scheveningen, Netherlands
- Occupation: Artist
- Known for: Kinetic sculpture

Theodorus Gerardus Jozef Jansen (Dutch pronunciation: [ˈteːjoː ˈjɑnsə(n)]; born 14 March 1948) is a Dutch artist. In 1990, he began building large mechanisms out of PVC that were able to move on their own, collectively titled Strandbeest (Dutch for 'beach beast'). The kinetic sculptures appear to walk. His animated works are intended to be a fusion of art and engineering. He has said that "The walls between art and engineering exist only in our minds". Some of his creations are reported to incorporate primitive logic gates for collision detection with obstacles such as the sea.

== Early life ==
Jansen was born in Scheveningen in the Netherlands. He grew up with a talent for both physics and art, and studied physics at the Delft University of Technology. Jansen left the university in 1974 without a degree. While at Delft, Jansen was involved in many projects that involved both art and technology, including a paint machine and a flying-saucer machine.

=== Flying saucer ===
In 1979 Jansen started using cheap PVC pipes to build a 4-metre (13 ft)-wide flying saucer that was filled with helium. It was launched over Delft in 1980 on a day when the sky was hazy. Light and sound came from the saucer. Because the saucer was black against a light sky, its size was difficult to determine. The police even stated that it was 30 meters wide, and some people swore they saw a halo around it. Jansen has claimed that this project "caused a near-riot". He said that the machine was never found, and that it probably landed somewhere in Belgium. He later repeated the project over Paris.

=== Painting machine ===
Jansen's painting machine was developed in 1984–86 in Delft, and it was a somewhat larger project than his flying saucer. It consisted of a tube with a light cell situated at its end. When darkness was detected, the machine would begin to spray paint, creating painted silhouettes of people standing in front of it. This machine was also attached to a large piece of wood that was hoisted against a wall, where it would move back and forth to create 2-D images of everything in the room.

== The strandbeest ==
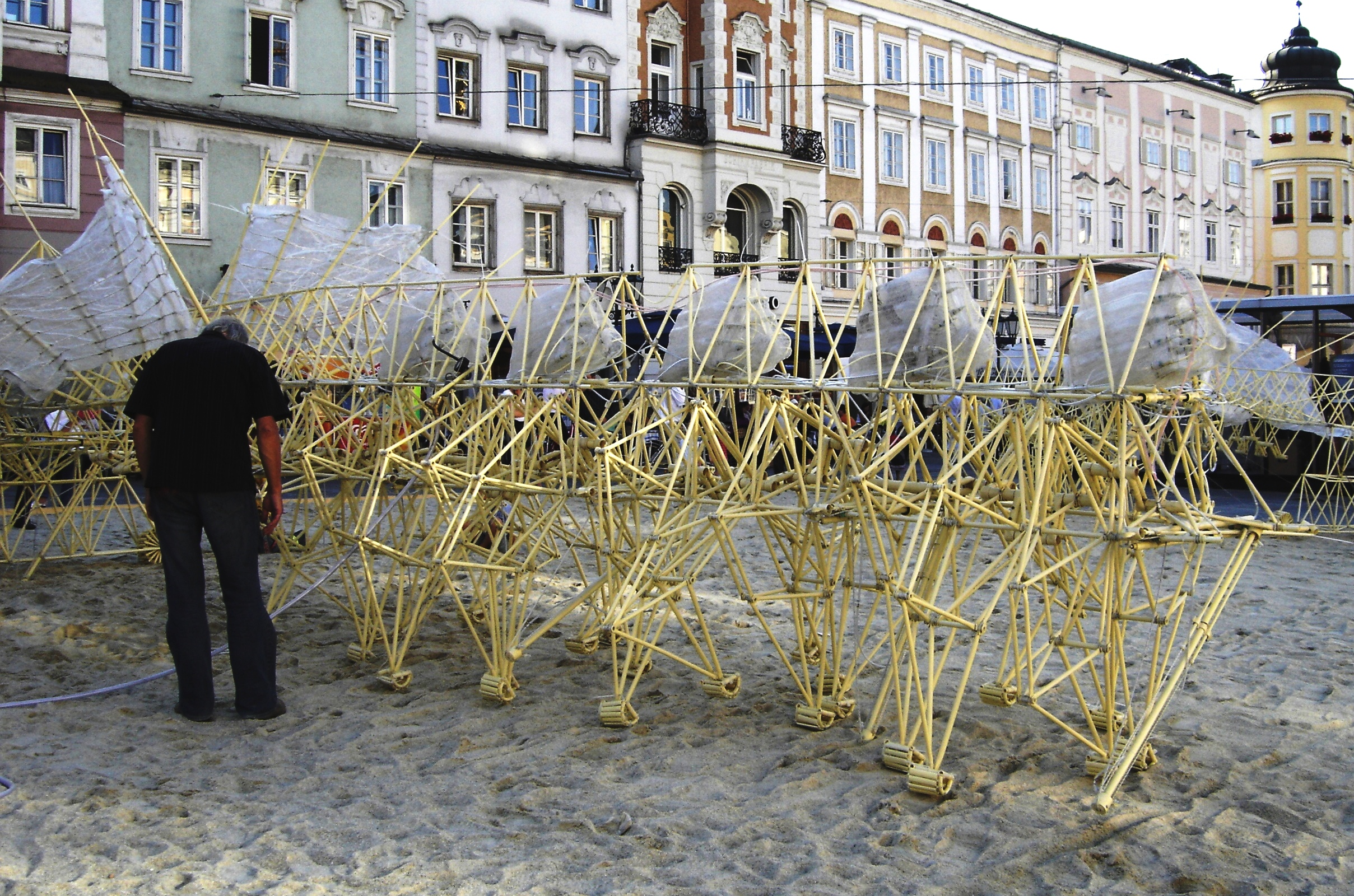
A strandbeest, exhibited by Jansen on the Linz city square during Ars Electronica, 2005

A strandbeest in action

Since 1990, Jansen has been creating strandbeesten (Dutch for "beach beasts", singular strandbeest - see also English cognate strand), which are moving kinetic structures, sometimes wind-propelled, that resemble walking animals, described by Jansen as artificial life. All of his models are based on a system of triangles and connecting links which convert the rotation of an axle into a stepping motion of six or more legs. This allows the strandbeesten to travel over sand much more efficiently than if they were to travel on wheels. What was at first a rudimentary "breed" has evolved slowly, with the help of evolutionary computation techniques, into a generation of kinetic sculptures that can react to their environment to some degree. According to Jansen, he was inspired by The Blind Watchmaker by Richard Dawkins. Jansen has said "I make skeletons that are able to walk on the wind. Over time, these skeletons have become increasingly better at surviving the elements such as storms and water and eventually I want to put these animals out in herds on the beaches, so they will live their own lives".

Constructed from PVC piping, wood, fabric airfoils, and cable ties, Jansen's sculptures are constantly being improved and are designed to function in the sandy beach environment in which Jansen releases them. The sculptures are also able to store air pressure in order to propel themselves in the absence of wind. Jansen's more sophisticated creations are able to detect when they have entered water and are then able to move away from it. One model is capable of anchoring itself to the earth if an approaching storm is sensed.

A 2016 episode of The Simpsons, "The Nightmare After Krustmas", featured the strandbeesten and Jansen. He provided the voice for his cartoon character.

=== Evolutionary periods of Strandbeest ===
- Volantum – Flying Strandbeests; 2020–2021
- Bruchum – Caterpillar Strandbeests; 2016–2019
- Aurum – "Weak wind" Strandbeests; 2013–2015
- Aspersorium – Tail-wagging Strandbeests; 2012–2013
- Suicideem – "Suicidal" (Note: Theo Jansen describes this period of evolution as suicidal because of the machines collapsing on themselves due to the newest installation of pressure-powered pistons; These pistons would cause the delicate joints of the beasts to be overloaded, leading them to collapse on the beach, hence they were "suicidal".) Strandbeests; 2009–2011
- Cerebrum – Simple Brained Strandbeests; 2006–2008
- Vaporum – Pneumatic-powered Strandbeests; 2001–2006
- Lignatum – Wood-based (Note: These Strandbeests only lasted for one generation; As Theo describes: "The Lignatum was a period of infidelity. I cheated on my plastic tubes. I was still in love with electricity pipe but I had been seduced by wood as a building material. It grew into an affair. For at least two years I had two relationships going with two different materials, plastic and wood".) Strandbeests; 1997–2001
- Tepideem – Herd Strandbeests; 1994–1997
- Calidum – "Osteoporosis" (Note: Strandbeests in this era were formed by heat gun, which was used to soften plastic to mold it in conformations that Theo Jansen wanted; As he describes: "The heat gun has a button with two positions, one for high-temperature use and the other for low. It transpired that the high-temperature position was suitable for stripping off old layers of paint and the other for softening up plastic tubes. I hadn’t been aware of this difference at first. I had always used the gun on 'hot' as it did the job quickly. After a year, joints made this way were found to be brittle. You don't notice that right away, but only after a year. The strandbeests from the Calidum suffered from 'osteoporosis'.") Strandbeests; 1993–1994
- Chorda – Cable-tie Strandbeests; 1991–1993
- Gluton – Adhesive tape Strandbeests; 1990–1991
- Pregluton – Pre-Strandbeests, beginning of ideas and drawings; 1986–1989

== See also ==
- Genetic algorithm
- Jansen's linkage
- Soda Constructor
