= Kinematic diagram =

Representation of the connectivity of a mechanism's links and joints

Dimensioned drawing of a slider-crank (left) and its kinematic diagram (right).

In mechanical engineering, a kinematic diagram or kinematic scheme (also called a joint map or skeleton diagram) illustrates the connectivity of links and joints of a mechanism or machine rather than the dimensions or shape of the parts. Often links are presented as geometric objects, such as lines, triangles or squares, that support schematic versions of the joints of the mechanism or machine.

For example, the figures show the kinematic diagrams (i) of the slider-crank that forms a piston and crank-shaft in an engine, and (ii) of the first three joints for a PUMA manipulator.

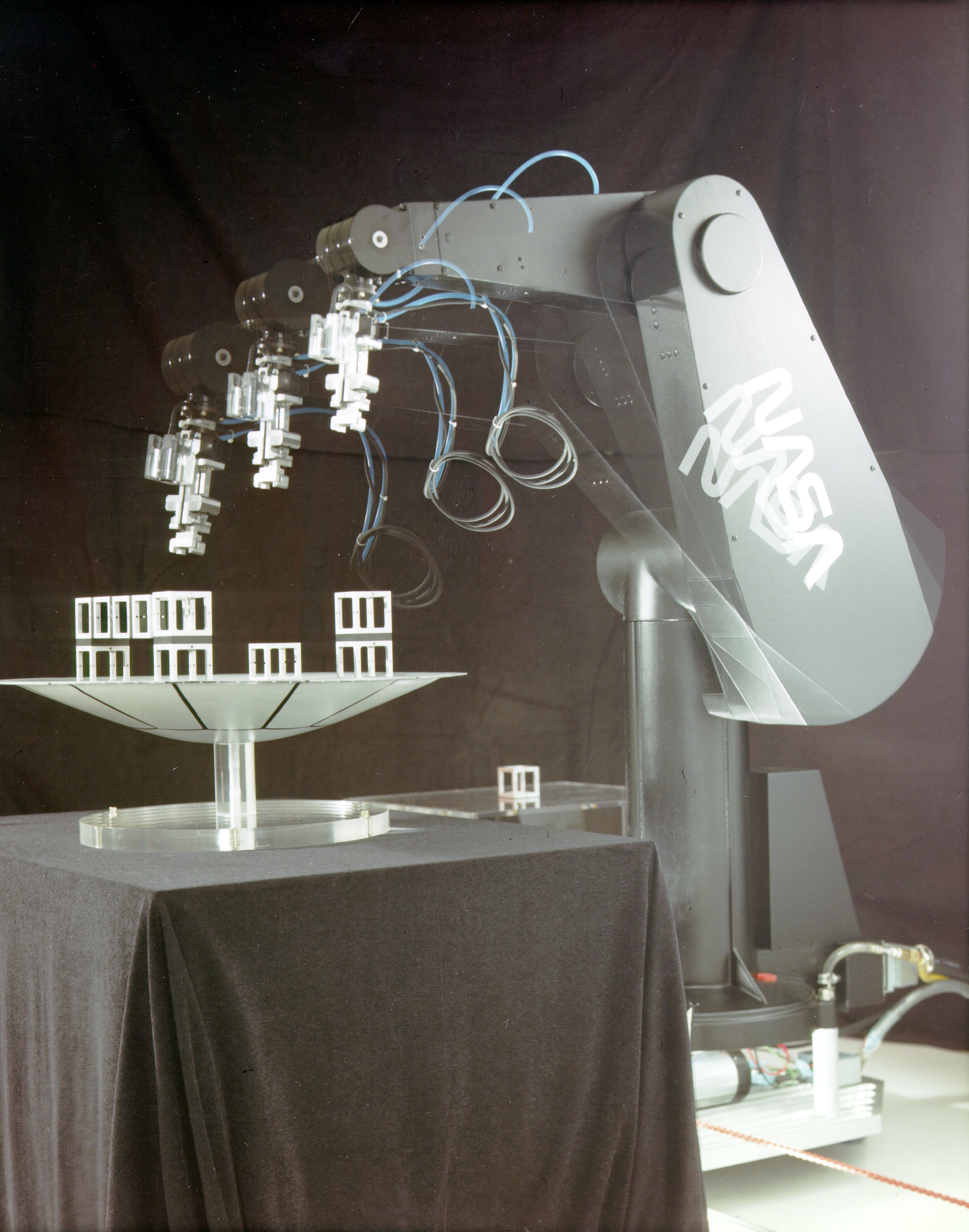
PUMA robot

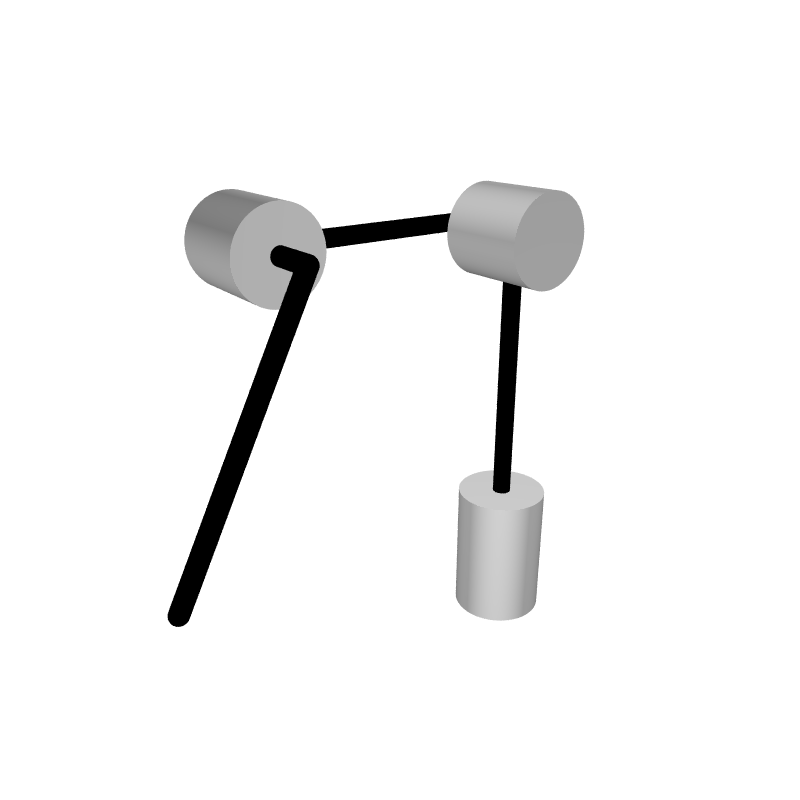
and its kinematic diagram

== Linkage graph ==
A kinematic diagram can be formulated as a graph by representing the joints of the mechanism as vertices and the links as edges of the graph. This version of the kinematic diagram has proven effective in enumerating kinematic structures in the process of machine design.

An important consideration in this design process is the degree of freedom of the system of links and joints, which is determined using the Chebychev–Grübler–Kutzbach criterion.

== Elements of machines ==
Elements of kinematics diagrams include the frame, which is the frame of reference for all the moving components, as well as links (kinematic pairs), and joints. Primary Joints include pins, sliders and other elements that allow pure rotation or pure linear motion. Higher order joints also exist that allow a combination of rotation or linear motion. Kinematic diagrams also include points of interest, and other important components.

== See also ==
- Free body diagram
- Kinematic synthesis
- Left-hand–right-hand activity chart
