= Jacques Denavit =

US mechanics and physics academic

- Born: October 1, 1930; Paris, France
- Died: 12 September 2013 (aged 82); Pleasanton, California, U.S.
- Education: University of Paris (BS, 1952), Northwestern University (MSc, 1953; PhD, 1956)

Jacques Denavit (1 October 1930 – 12 September 2013) was a physicist and professor of mechanical engineering. Together with his teacher Richard S. Hartenberg, he developed the Denavit-Hartenberg convention where one can calculate the forward kinematics of a kinematic chain using matrices. He joined the Department of Mechanical Engineering and Astronomical Science at Northwestern in 1958. This is where Denavit started collaborating with Richard S. Hartenberg. Together, they introduced many concepts in kinematics of serial manipulators. Denavit was named a Fellow of the American Physical Society in 1977. He retired in 1982.

== Selected publications ==
1. A Kinematic Notation for Lower-Pair Mechanisms Based on Matrices (1955)
2. Kinematic Synthesis of Linkages (1964)
3. Numerical simulation of plasmas with periodic smoothing in phase space (1972)
