= Zero Reference Model =

Robot kinematics description method

In Robotics engineering, Zero Reference Model (ZRM) is a method for describing the kinematics of a serial manipulator, alternative to the Denavit-Hartenberg parameters (DH). It was introduced by Gupta in 1981. with the name Zero Reference Position Description.

Some authors claim that ZRM is superior to DH, for example in the case of geometric parameters calibration

== Zero Reference Model ==
The basic principle of ZRM consists in describing the location of the robot joints and their rotation/translation axes, in the base coordinate system, when all joint values are equal to zero. Gupta presents the ZRM for a serial manipulator as a table with four columns containing:

1. The joint number i and its type (R for rotational and P for prismatic)
2. The joint direction as a vector $u_0^i$
3. The joint center as a position $Q_0^i$
4. The Hand Data as a position $Q_0^h$ and two orthogonal vectors $u_0^a$ (direction of gripping) and $u_0^t$ (direction of the gripper tongs)

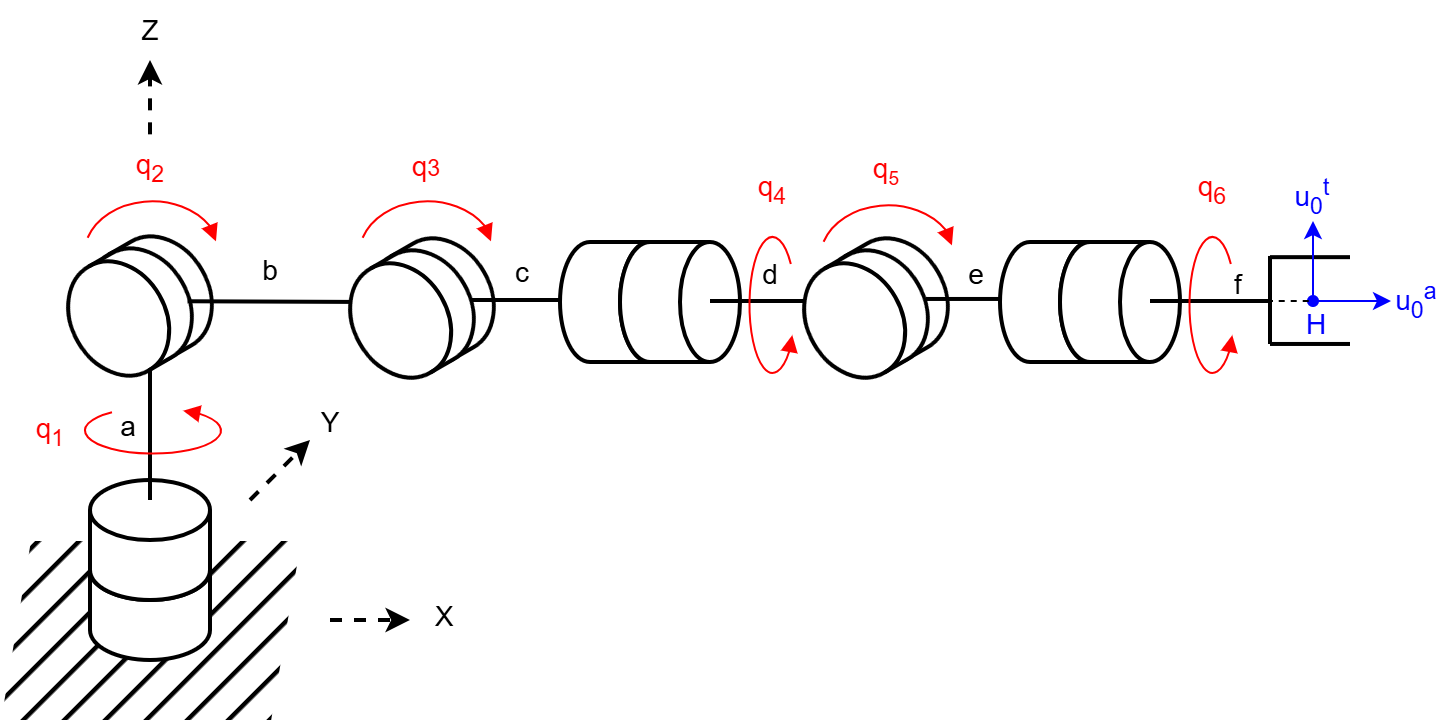
Example of a simple serial manipulator for illustrating the Zero Reference Model

The ZRM table for a simple serial manipulator with 6 joints is shown below:

Joint nb $i$, joint type	Joint dir $u_0^i$	Joint pos $Q_0^i$	Hand data
1, R	(0, 0, 1)	(0, 0, 0)	$Q_0^h$ = (b + c + d + e + f, 0, a) $u_0^a$ = (1, 0, 0) $u_0^t$ = (0, 0, 1)
2, R	(0, 1, 0)	(0, 0, a)	$Q_0^h$ = (b + c + d + e + f, 0, a) $u_0^a$ = (1, 0, 0) $u_0^t$ = (0, 0, 1)
3, R	(0, 1, 0)	(b, 0, a)	$Q_0^h$ = (b + c + d + e + f, 0, a) $u_0^a$ = (1, 0, 0) $u_0^t$ = (0, 0, 1)
4, R	(1, 0, 0)	(b + c, 0, a)	$Q_0^h$ = (b + c + d + e + f, 0, a) $u_0^a$ = (1, 0, 0) $u_0^t$ = (0, 0, 1)
5, R	(0, 1, 0)	(b + c + d, 0, a)	$Q_0^h$ = (b + c + d + e + f, 0, a) $u_0^a$ = (1, 0, 0) $u_0^t$ = (0, 0, 1)
6, R	(1, 0, 0)	(b + c + d + e, 0, a)	$Q_0^h$ = (b + c + d + e + f, 0, a) $u_0^a$ = (1, 0, 0) $u_0^t$ = (0, 0, 1)

The transformation of the hand with respect to the base is calculated as follows:

$[T] = [T_0^1].[T_1^2]...[T_{n-1}^n].[T_n^h]$

Each individual transformation $T_{i-1}^i$ is the combination of the translation $Q_{i-1}^i$ and the rotation $R_{i-1}^i$ with:

- For a rotative joint: $Q_{i-1}^i = Q_0^i - Q_0^{i-1}$ and $R_{i-1}^i = Rot(q_i, u_0^i)$
- For a prismatic joint: $Q_{i-1}^i = (Q_0^i - Q_0^{i-1}) + q_i.u_0^i$ and $R_{i-1}^i = Id$

The transformation $[T_n^h]$ is given as:

$$[T_n^h] =
\begin{pmatrix}
u_0^t \times u_0^a & u_0^t & u_0^a & Q_0^h - Q_0^n \\
0 & 0 & 0 & 1
\end{pmatrix}$$

== Discussion ==
While the ZRM representation is not as compact as the DH parameters, it has a number of advantages:

- It is really straightforward and less error-prone, e.g. when describing the kinematics of a manipulator from the vendor documentation.
- It leads to simple calculations, especially when using unitary quaternions for the rotations, as $R_i^j = cos(\frac{q_j}{2}) + sin(\frac{q_j}{2}).(u_{i0_x} i +u_{i0_y} j + u_{i0_z} k)$

A more compact form can be obtained by using $Q_{i-1}^i$ instead of $Q_0^i$ in the third column, and a position and quaternion in the fourth. The table above becomes:

Joint nb $i$, joint type	Joint dir $u_{i-1}^i$	Joint pos $Q_{i-1}^i$	Hand data
1, R	(0, 0, 1)	(0, 0, 0)	$Q_6^h$ = (f, 0, 0) $R_6^h$ = $Id$
2, R	(0, 1, 0)	(0, 0, a)	$Q_6^h$ = (f, 0, 0) $R_6^h$ = $Id$
3, R	(0, 1, 0)	(b, 0, 0)	$Q_6^h$ = (f, 0, 0) $R_6^h$ = $Id$
4, R	(1, 0, 0)	(c, 0, 0)	$Q_6^h$ = (f, 0, 0) $R_6^h$ = $Id$
5, R	(0, 1, 0)	(d, 0, 0)	$Q_6^h$ = (f, 0, 0) $R_6^h$ = $Id$
6, R	(1, 0, 0)	(e, 0, 0)	$Q_6^h$ = (f, 0, 0) $R_6^h$ = $Id$

The ZRM of a serial manipulator can be described even if the manipulator cannot reach the zero value on all joints because of mechanical limitations.
