= Common normal (robotics) =

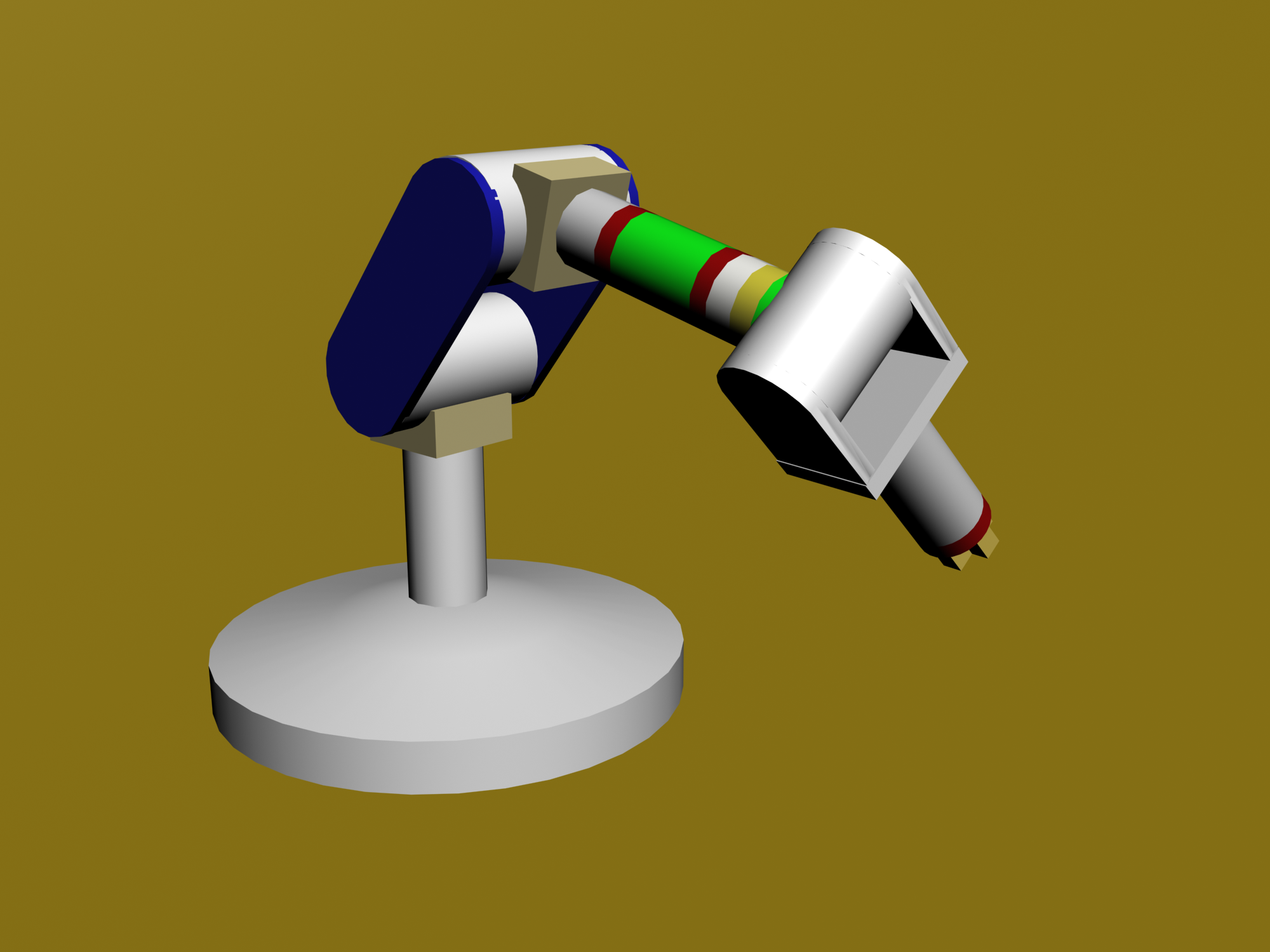
A model of a robotic arm with joints.

In robotics the common normal of two non-intersecting joint axes is a line perpendicular to both axes.

The common normal can be used to characterize robot arm links, by using the "common normal distance" and the angle between the link axes in a plane perpendicular to the common normal. When two consecutive joint axes are parallel, the common normal is not unique and an arbitrary common normal may be used, usually one that passes through the center of a coordinate system.

The common normal is widely used in the representation of the frames of reference for robot joints and links, and the selection of minimal representations with the Denavit–Hartenberg parameters.

== See also ==
- Denavit–Hartenberg parameters
- Forward kinematics
- Robotic arm
