= Robotics engineering =

Engineering discipline focused on robots

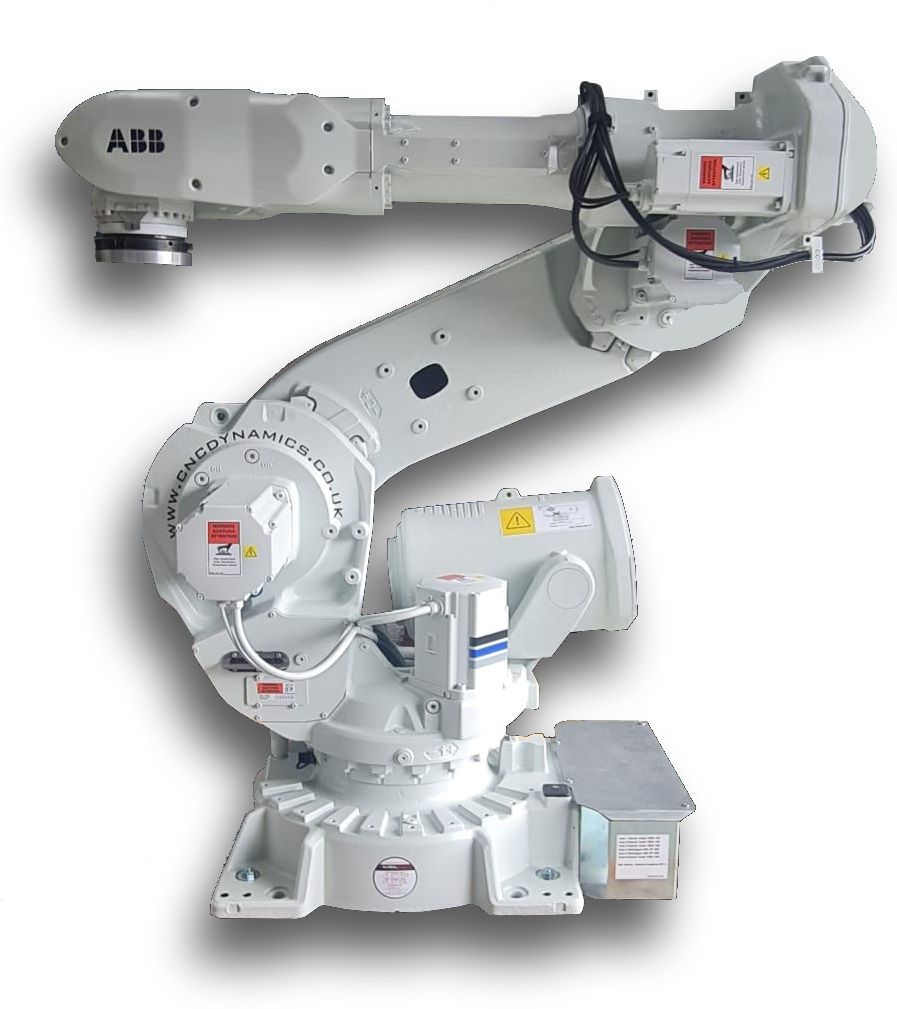
CNC Support Robot

Robotics engineering is a branch of engineering that focuses on the conception, design, manufacturing, and operation of robots. It involves a multidisciplinary approach, drawing primarily from mechanical, electrical, software, and artificial intelligence (AI) engineering .

Robotics engineers are tasked with designing these robots to function reliably and safely in real-world scenarios, which often require addressing complex mechanical movements, real-time control, and adaptive decision-making through software and AI.

== Fundamental disciplines ==
Robotics engineering combines several technical disciplines, all of which contribute to the performance, autonomy, and robustness of a robot.

=== Mechanical engineering and kinematics ===
Mechanical engineering is responsible for the physical construction and movement of robots. This involves designing the robot's structure, joints, and actuators, as well as analyzing its kinematics and dynamics.

==== Kinematics ====
Kinematic models are essential for controlling the movements of robots. Robotics engineers use forward kinematics to calculate the positions and orientations of a robot's end-effector, given specific joint angles, and inverse kinematics to determine the joint movements necessary for a desired end-effector position. These calculations allow for precise control over tasks such as object manipulation or locomotion.

==== Actuation and materials ====
Robotics engineers select actuators—such as electric motors, hydraulic systems, or pneumatic systems — based on the robot's intended function, power needs, and desired performance characteristics. Materials used in the construction of robots are also carefully chosen for strength, flexibility, and weight, with lightweight alloys and composite materials being popular choices for mobile robots.

=== Electrical and electronics engineering ===
Robots depend on electrical systems for power, communication, and control.

==== Power management ====
Powering a robot's motors, sensors, and processing units requires sophisticated electrical circuit design. Robotics engineers ensure that power is distributed efficiently and safely across the system, often using batteries or external power sources in a way that minimizes energy waste.

==== Signal processing and sensors ====
A robot's ability to interact with its environment depends on its ability to interpret data from various sensors and coordinate it into varying types of electrical control circuits, such as systems to process signals from cameras, LiDAR, ultrasonic sensors, and force sensors, systems to filter out noise and convert raw data into usable information for the robot's control systems.

=== Software engineering ===
Software engineering is a fundamental aspect of robotics, focusing on the development of the code and systems that control a robot's hardware, manage real-time decision-making, and ensure reliable operation in complex environments. Software in robotics encompasses both low-level control software and high-level applications that enable advanced functionalities.

==== Embedded systems ====
Robotics engineers develop embedded systems that interface directly with a robot's hardware, managing actuators, sensors, and communication systems. These systems must operate in real-time to process sensor inputs and trigger appropriate actions, often with strict constraints on memory and processing power.

==== Software architectures and frameworks ====
Modern robots rely on modular and scalable software architectures. A popular framework in the field is the Robot Operating System (ROS), which facilitates communication between different subsystems and simplifies the development of robotic applications. Engineers use such frameworks to build flexible systems capable of handling tasks such as motion planning, perception, and autonomous decision-making.

==== Real-time systems ====
Robots frequently operate in environments where real-time processing is critical. Robotics engineers design software that can respond to sensor data and control actuators within tight time constraints. This includes optimizing algorithms for low-latency and developing robust error-handling procedures to prevent system failure during operation.

=== AI engineering ===
AI engineering plays an increasingly critical role in enabling robots to perform complex, adaptive tasks. It focuses on integrating artificial intelligence techniques such as machine learning, computer vision, and natural language processing to enhance a robot's autonomy and intelligence.

==== Perception and computer vision ====
Robots equipped with AI-powered perception systems can process and interpret visual and sensory data from their surroundings. Robotics engineers develop algorithms for object recognition, scene understanding, and real-time tracking, allowing robots to perceive their environment in ways similar to humans. These systems are often used for tasks such as autonomous navigation or grasping objects in unstructured environments.

==== Machine learning for control and decision-making ====
Machine learning techniques, particularly reinforcement learning and deep learning, allow robots to improve their performance over time. Robotics engineers design AI models that enable robots to learn from their experiences, optimizing control strategies and decision-making processes. This is particularly useful in environments where pre-programmed behavior is insufficient, such as in search and rescue missions or unpredictable industrial tasks.

=== Control systems and feedback loops ===
Control systems engineering ensures that robots move accurately and perform tasks in response to environmental stimuli. Robotics engineers design control algorithms that manage the interaction between sensors, actuators, and software.

==== Closed-loop control ====
Most robots rely on closed-loop control systems, where sensors provide continuous feedback to adjust movements and behaviors. This is essential in applications like robotic surgery, where extreme precision is required, or in manufacturing, where consistent performance over repetitive tasks is critical.

==== Adaptive and nonlinear control systems ====
For more advanced applications, robotics engineers develop adaptive control systems that can modify their behavior in response to changing environments. Nonlinear control techniques are employed when dealing with complex dynamics that are difficult to model using traditional methods, such as controlling the flight of drones or autonomous underwater vehicles.

== Key tools and technologies ==
Robotics engineers leverage a wide array of software tools and technologies to design, test, and refine robotic systems.

=== Simulation software ===
Before physical prototypes are created, robotics engineers use advanced simulation software to model and predict the behavior of robotic systems in virtual environments. MATLAB and Simulink are standard tools for simulating both the kinematics (motion) and dynamics (forces) of robots. These platforms allow engineers to develop control algorithms, run system-level tests, and assess performance under various conditions without needing physical hardware. ROS (Robot Operating System) is another key framework, facilitating the simulation of robot behaviors in different environments.

=== CAD and 3D modeling ===
For mechanical design, robotics engineers use Computer-Aided Design (CAD) software, such as SolidWorks, AutoCAD, and PTC Creo, to create detailed 3D models of robotic components. These models are essential for visualizing the physical structure of the robot and for ensuring that all mechanical parts fit together precisely. CAD models are often integrated with simulation tools to test mechanical functionality and detect design flaws early in the process.

=== Rapid prototyping and 3D printing ===
Once the designs are verified through simulation, rapid prototyping technologies, including 3D printing and CNC machining, allow for the quick and low-cost creation of physical prototypes. These methods enable engineers to iterate quickly, refining the design based on real-world testing and feedback, reducing the time to market.

=== Finite element analysis (FEA) ===
To ensure the robustness and durability of robotic components, engineers perform structural testing using finite alement analysis (FEA) software like ANSYS and Abaqus. FEA helps predict how materials will respond to stress, heat, and other environmental factors, optimizing designs for strength, efficiency, and material usage.

=== Hardware-in-the-loop (HIL) testing ===
To bridge the gap between simulation and physical testing, robotics engineers often use hardware-in-the-loop (HIL) systems. HIL testing integrates real hardware components into simulation models, allowing engineers to validate control algorithms and system responses in real-time without needing the full robotic system built, thus reducing risks and costs.

== Challenges ==
The complexity of robotics engineering presents ongoing challenges.

=== Robustness and fault tolerance ===
Designing robots that can reliably operate in unpredictable environments is a key engineering challenge. Engineers must create systems that can detect and recover from hardware malfunctions, sensor failures, or software errors. This is important in mission-critical applications such as space exploration or medical robotics.

=== Safety in human-robot interaction ===
Ensuring safety in human-robot interaction is a significant challenge in the field of robotics engineering. In addition to technical aspects, such as the development of sensitive control systems and force-limited actuators, engineers must address the ethical and legal implications of these interactions. AI algorithms are employed to enable robots to anticipate and respond to human behavior in collaborative environments; however, these systems are not without flaws. When errors occur—such as a robot misinterpreting human movement or failing to halt its actions in time—the issue of responsibility arises.

This question of accountability poses a substantial ethical dilemma. Should the responsibility for such errors fall upon the engineers who designed the robot, the manufacturers who produced it, or the organizations that deploy it? Furthermore, in cases where AI algorithms play a key role in the robot's decision-making process, there is the added complexity of determining whether the system itself could be partly accountable. This issue is particularly pertinent in industries such as healthcare and autonomous vehicles, where mistakes may result in severe consequences, including injury or death.

Current legal frameworks in many countries have not yet fully addressed the complexities of human-robot interaction. Laws concerning liability, negligence, and safety standards often struggle to keep pace with technological advancements. The creation of regulations that clearly define accountability, establish safety protocols, and safeguard human rights will be crucial as robots become increasingly integrated into daily life.

=== Optimization of motion and energy efficiency ===
Robotics engineers must balance the need for high performance with energy efficiency. Motion-planning algorithms and energy-saving strategies are critical for mobile robots, especially in applications like autonomous drones or long-duration robotic missions where battery life is limited.

== See also ==
- List of roboticists
- List of robotics occupations
