= Kinematics equations =

Constraint equations of a mechanical system

Kinematics equations are the constraint equations of a mechanical system such as a robot manipulator that define how input movement at one or more joints specifies the configuration of the device, in order to achieve a task position or end-effector location. Kinematics equations are used to analyze and design articulated systems ranging from four-bar linkages to serial and parallel robots.

Kinematics equations are constraint equations that characterize the geometric configuration of an articulated mechanical system. Therefore, these equations assume the links are rigid and the joints provide pure rotation or translation. Constraint equations of this type are known as holonomic constraints in the study of the dynamics of multi-body systems.

== Loop equations ==
The kinematics equations for a mechanical system are formed as a sequence of rigid transformations along links and around joints in a mechanical system. The principle that the sequence of transformations around a loop must return to the identity provides what are known as the loop equations. An independent set of kinematics equations is assembled from the various sets of loop equations that are available in a mechanical system.

=== Transformations ===
In 1955, Jacques Denavit and Richard Hartenberg introduced a convention for the definition of the joint matrices [Z] and link matrices [X] to standardize the coordinate frames for spatial linkages. This convention positions the joint frame so that it consists of a screw displacement along the Z-axis

$$[Z_i] =  \begin{bmatrix}
\cos\theta_i & -\sin\theta_i & 0 & 0 \\
\sin\theta_i &  \cos\theta_i & 0  & 0 \\
0 & 0 & 1 & d_i \\
0 & 0 & 0 & 1
\end{bmatrix},$$

and it positions the link frame so it consists of a screw displacement along the X-axis,

$$[X_i]=\begin{bmatrix}
1 & 0 & 0 & a_{i,i+1} \\
0 & \cos\alpha_{i,i+1} & -\sin\alpha_{i,i+1}& 0 \\
0 & \sin\alpha_{i,i+1} & \cos\alpha_{i,i+1} & 0 \\
0 & 0 & 0 & 1
\end{bmatrix}.$$

The kinematics equations are obtained using a rigid transformation [Z] to characterize the relative movement allowed at each joint and separate rigid transformation [X] to define the dimensions of each link.

The result is a sequence of rigid transformations alternating joint and link transformations from the base of the chain, around a loop, and back to the base to obtain the loop equation,

$$[Z_1][X_1][Z_2][X_2]\ldots[X_{n-1}][Z_n]=[I].\!$$

The series of transformations equates to the identity matrix because they return to the beginning of the loop.

== Serial chains ==
The kinematics equations for a serial chain robot are obtained by formulating the loop equations in terms of a transformation [T] from the base to the end-effector, which is equated to the series of transformations along the robot. The result is,

$$[T] = [Z_1][X_1][Z_2][X_2]\ldots[X_{n-1}][Z_n],\!$$

These equations are called the kinematics equations of the serial chain.

== Parallel chains ==
The kinematics equations for a parallel chain, or parallel robot, formed by an end-effector supported by multiple serial chains are obtained from the kinematics equations of each of the supporting serial chains. Suppose that m serial chains support the end-effector, then the transformation from the base to the end-effector is defined by m equations,

$$[T] = [Z_{1,j}][X_{1,j}][Z_{2,j}][X_{2,j}]\ldots[X_{n-1,j}][Z_{n,j}],\quad j=1,\ldots, m.\!$$

These equations are the kinematics equations of the parallel chain.

== Kinematic equations for uniform acceleration ==
In physics, when the acceleration of an object is uniform, we are able to derive three kinematic equations,
$$\begin{align}
\Delta\mathbf{x} &= \mathbf{v}_\mathrm{i}  t + \tfrac{1}{2} \mathbf{a} t^2
&= \mathbf{v}_{avg}t \\
\Delta\mathbf{v} &= \mathbf{a} t \\
\Delta v^2       &= 2\mathbf{a \cdot}\Delta\mathbf x,
\end{align}$$
where $\Delta\mathbf x$ is the change in position (or displacement,) $\Delta\mathbf v$ is the change in velocity, $\mathbf{v}_{avg}=\tfrac{1}{2}(\mathbf{v}_{i}+\mathbf{v}_{f})$ is the average velocity, $\mathbf a$ is the uniform acceleration, $t$ is the time elapsed, $\Delta v^2 = v_\mathrm{f}^2 - v_\mathrm{i}^2$ is the change in the square of the velocity.

=== Use in simulation ===
When simulating data, we can calculate the successive state of the object as,
$$\begin{align}
\mathbf{x}_{n+1} &= \mathbf{x}_n + \mathbf{v}_n t + \tfrac{1}{2} \mathbf{a} t^2 \\
\mathbf{v}_{n+1} &= \mathbf{v}_n + \mathbf{a} t
\end{align}.$$
In programming, this is often performed with the algorithm,
$$\begin{align}
\mathbf{x} &\leftarrow \mathbf{x} + \mathbf{v} t + \tfrac{1}{2} \mathbf{a} t^2 \\
\mathbf{v} &\leftarrow \mathbf{v} + \mathbf{a} t
\end{align}.$$
We can use these kinematic equations in conjunction with a predefined average acceleration to predict the next state of the object. We can write this in C as,

const int d; // predefined dimensionality of the problem
void unif_acc_state_update(float *x, float *v, float *a, float t){
    // Precondition: x, v, and a are arrays of dimension d
    for(int i = 0; i < d; i++){
        x[i] += v[i]*t + 0.5*a[i]*t*t;
        v[i] += a[i]*t;
    }
}

== Forward kinematics ==
The kinematics equations of serial and parallel robots can be viewed as relating parameters, such as joint angles, that are under the control of actuators to the position and orientation [T] of the end-effector.

From this point of view the kinematics equations can be used in two different ways. The first called forward kinematics uses specified values for the joint parameters to compute the end-effector position and orientation. The second called inverse kinematics uses the position and orientation of the end-effector to compute the joint parameters values.

Remarkably, while the forward kinematics of a serial chain is a direct calculation of a single matrix equation, the forward kinematics of a parallel chain requires the simultaneous solution of multiple matrix equations which presents a significant challenge.
