= Left-hand–right-hand activity chart =

Left-hand–right-hand activity chart is an illustration that shows the contributions of the right and left hands of a worker and the balance of the workload between the right and left hands.
