= Chebychev–Grübler–Kutzbach criterion =

Formula for the mobility of a kinematic chain

The Chebychev–Grübler–Kutzbach criterion determines the number of degrees of freedom of a kinematic chain, that is, a coupling of rigid bodies by means of mechanical constraints. These devices are also called linkages.

The Kutzbach criterion is also called the mobility formula, because it computes the number of parameters that define the configuration of a linkage from the number of links and joints and the degree of freedom at each joint.

Interesting and useful linkages have been designed that violate the mobility formula by using special geometric features and dimensions to provide more mobility than predicted by this formula. These devices are called overconstrained mechanisms.

== Mobility formula ==
The mobility formula counts the number of parameters that define the positions of a set of rigid bodies and then reduces this number by the constraints that are imposed by joints connecting these bodies.

Imagine a spherical seagull. A single unconstrained body soaring in 3-space has 6 degrees of freedom: 3 translational (say, x,y,z); and 3 rotational (say, roll, pitch, yaw).

So a system of $n$ unconnected rigid bodies moving in space (a flock of $n$ soaring seagulls) has $6n$ degrees of freedom measured relative to a fixed frame (coordinate system). The fixed frame can be chosen arbitrarily (an observer anywhere on the beach). And the frame can even be local or subjective: from the viewpoint of one of the seagulls, the world moves around it, while it stays fixed. So this frame can be included in the count of bodies (the flock of seagulls as seen from chosen gull A--perhaps A is standing on the beach, perhaps A is flying, but looking at the flock from the fixed local viewpoint of A), and thus mobility is independent of the choice of the link that will form the fixed frame. Then the degree-of-freedom of this system is $M = 6(N-1),$ where $N=n+1$ is the number of moving bodies plus the fixed body.

Joints that connect bodies in this system remove degrees of freedom and reduce mobility. Specifically, hinges and sliders each impose five constraints and therefore remove five degrees of freedom. It is convenient to define the number of constraints $c$ that a joint imposes in terms of the joint's freedom $f,$ where $c = 6 - f.$ In the case of a hinge or slider, which are one degree of freedom joints, have $f = 1$ and therefore $c = 6 - 1 = 5.$

The result is that the mobility of a system formed from $n$ moving links and $j$ joints each with freedom $f_i$ for $i = 1, ..., j,$ is given by

$$M = 6n - \sum_{i=1}^j\ (6 - f_i) =  6(N-1 - j) + \sum_{i=1}^j\ f_i.$$

Recall that $N$ includes the fixed link.

There are two important special cases: (i) a simple open chain, and (ii) a simple closed chain. A simple open chain consists of $n$ moving links connected end to end by $j$ joints, with one end connected to a ground link. Thus, in this case $N = j + 1$ and the mobility of the chain is

$$M = \sum_{i=1}^j\ f_i$$

For a simple closed chain, $n$ moving links are connected end-to-end by $n + 1$ joints such that the two ends are connected to the ground link forming a loop. In this case, we have $N = j$ and the mobility of the chain is

$$M = \sum_{i=1}^j\ f_i - 6$$

An example of a simple open chain is a serial robot manipulator. These robotic systems are constructed from a series of links connected by six one degree-of-freedom revolute or prismatic joints, so the system has six degrees of freedom.

An example of a simple closed chain is the RSSR spatial four-bar linkage. The sum of the freedom of these joints is eight, so the mobility of the linkage is two, where one of the degrees of freedom is the rotation of the coupler around the line joining the two S joints.

=== Planar and spherical movement ===
It is common practice to design the linkage system so that the movement of all of the bodies are constrained to lie on parallel planes, to form what is known as a planar linkage. It is also possible to construct the linkage system so that all of the bodies move on concentric spheres, forming a spherical linkage. In both cases, the degrees of freedom of the links in each system is now three rather than six, and the constraints imposed by joints are now c = 3 − f.

In this case, the mobility formula is given by

$$M = 3(N- 1 - j)+ \sum_{i=1}^j\ f_i,$$

and the special cases become

- planar or spherical simple open chain,

$$M = \sum_{i=1}^j\ f_i,$$

- planar or spherical simple closed chain,

$$M = \sum_{i=1}^j\ f_i - 3.$$

An example of a planar simple closed chain is the planar four-bar linkage, which is a four-bar loop with four one degree-of-freedom joints and therefore has mobility M = 1.

== See also ==
- Burmester theory
- Four-bar linkage
- Linkage (mechanical)
- Machine (mechanical)
- Mechanical system
- Overconstrained mechanism
