= Kinematic synthesis =

Techniques for designing mechanisms to output desired forces and motions

In mechanical engineering, kinematic synthesis (also known as mechanism synthesis) determines the size and configuration of mechanisms that shape the flow of power through a mechanical system, or machine, to achieve a desired performance. The word synthesis refers to combining parts to form a whole. Hartenberg and Denavit describe kinematic synthesis as

...it is design, the creation of something new. Kinematically, it is the conversion of a motion idea into hardware.

The earliest machines were designed to amplify human and animal effort, later gear trains and linkage systems captured wind and flowing water to rotate millstones and pumps. More modern machines use chemical and electric power to manufacture, transport, and process items of all types. Kinematic synthesis is the collection of techniques for designing those elements of these machines that achieve required output forces and movement for a given input.

Applications of kinematic synthesis include determining:

- the topology and dimensions of a linkage system to achieve a specified task;
- the size and shape of links of a robot to move parts and apply forces in a specified workspace;
- the mechanical configuration of end-effectors, or grippers, for robotic systems;
- the shape of a cam and follower to achieve a desired output movement coordinated with a specified input movement;
- the shape of gear teeth to ensure a desired coordination of input and output movement;
- the configuration of a system of gears, belts, and cable, or rope drives, to perform a desired power transmission;
- the size and shape of fixturing systems to provide precision in part manufacture and component assembly.

Kinematic synthesis for a mechanical system is described as having three general phases, known as type synthesis, number synthesis and dimensional synthesis. Type synthesis matches the general characteristics of a mechanical system to the task at hand, selecting from an array of devices such as a cam-follower mechanism, linkage, gear train, a fixture or a robotic system for use in a required task. Number synthesis considers the various ways a particular device can be constructed, generally focussed on the number and features of the parts. Finally, dimensional synthesis determines the geometry and assembly of the components that form the device.

== Linkage synthesis ==
A linkage is an assembly of links and joints that is designed to provide required force and movement. Number synthesis of linkages which considers the number of links and the configuration of the joints is often called type synthesis, because it identifies the type of linkage. Generally, the number of bars, the joint types, and the configuration of the links and joints are determined before starting dimensional synthesis. However, design strategies have been developed that combine type and dimensional synthesis.

Dimensional synthesis of linkages begins with a task defined as the movement of an output link relative to a base reference frame. This task may consist of the trajectory of a moving point or the trajectory of a moving body. The kinematics equations, or loop equations, of the mechanism must be satisfied in all of the required positions of the moving point or body. The result is a system of equations that are solved to compute the dimensions of the linkage.

There are three general tasks for dimensional synthesis, i) path generation, in which the trajectory of a point in the output link is required, ii) motion generation, in which the trajectory of the output link is required, and iii) function generation in which the movement of the output link relative to an input link is required. The equations for function generation can be obtained from those for motion generation by considering the movement of the output link relative to an input link, rather than relative to the base frame.

The trajectory and motion requirements for dimensional synthesis are defined as sets of either instantaneous positions or finite positions. Instantaneous positions is a convenient way to describe requirements on the differential properties of the trajectory of a point or body, which are geometric versions of velocity, acceleration and rate of change of acceleration. The mathematical results that support instantaneous position synthesis are called curvature theory.

Finite-position synthesis has a task defined as a set of positions of the moving body relative to a base frame, or relative to an input link. A crank that connects a moving pivot to a base pivot constrains the center of the moving pivot to follow a circle. This yields constraint equations that can be solved graphically using techniques developed by L. Burmester, and called Burmester theory.

== Cam and follower design ==
A cam and follower mechanism uses the shape of the cam to guide the movement of the follower by direct contact. Kinematic synthesis of a cam and follower mechanism consists of finding the shape of the cam that guides a particular follower through the required movement.

Examples of cams with a knife edge, a roller and a flat-faced follower

A plate cam is connected to a base frame by hinged joint and the contour of the cam forms a surface that pushes on a follower. The connection of the follower to the base frame can be either a hinged or sliding joint to form a rotating and translating follower. The portion of the follower that contacts the cam can have any shape, such as a knife-edge, a roller, or flat-faced contact. As the cam rotates its contact with the follower face drives its output rotation or sliding movement.

The task for a cam and follower mechanism is provided by a displacement diagram, which defines the rotation angle or sliding distance of the follower as a function of the rotation of the cam. Once the contact shape of follower and its motion are defined, the cam can be constructed using graphical or numerical techniques.

== Gear teeth and gear train design ==
A pair of mating gears can be viewed as a cam and follower mechanism designed to use the rotary movement of an input shaft to drive the rotary movement of an output shaft. This is achieved by providing a series of cam and followers, or gear teeth, distributed around the circumferences of two circles that form the mating gears. Early implementation of this rotary movement used cylindrical and rectangular teeth without concern for smooth transmission of movement, while the teeth were engaged---see the photo of the main drive gears for the windmill Doesburgermolen in Ede, Netherlands.

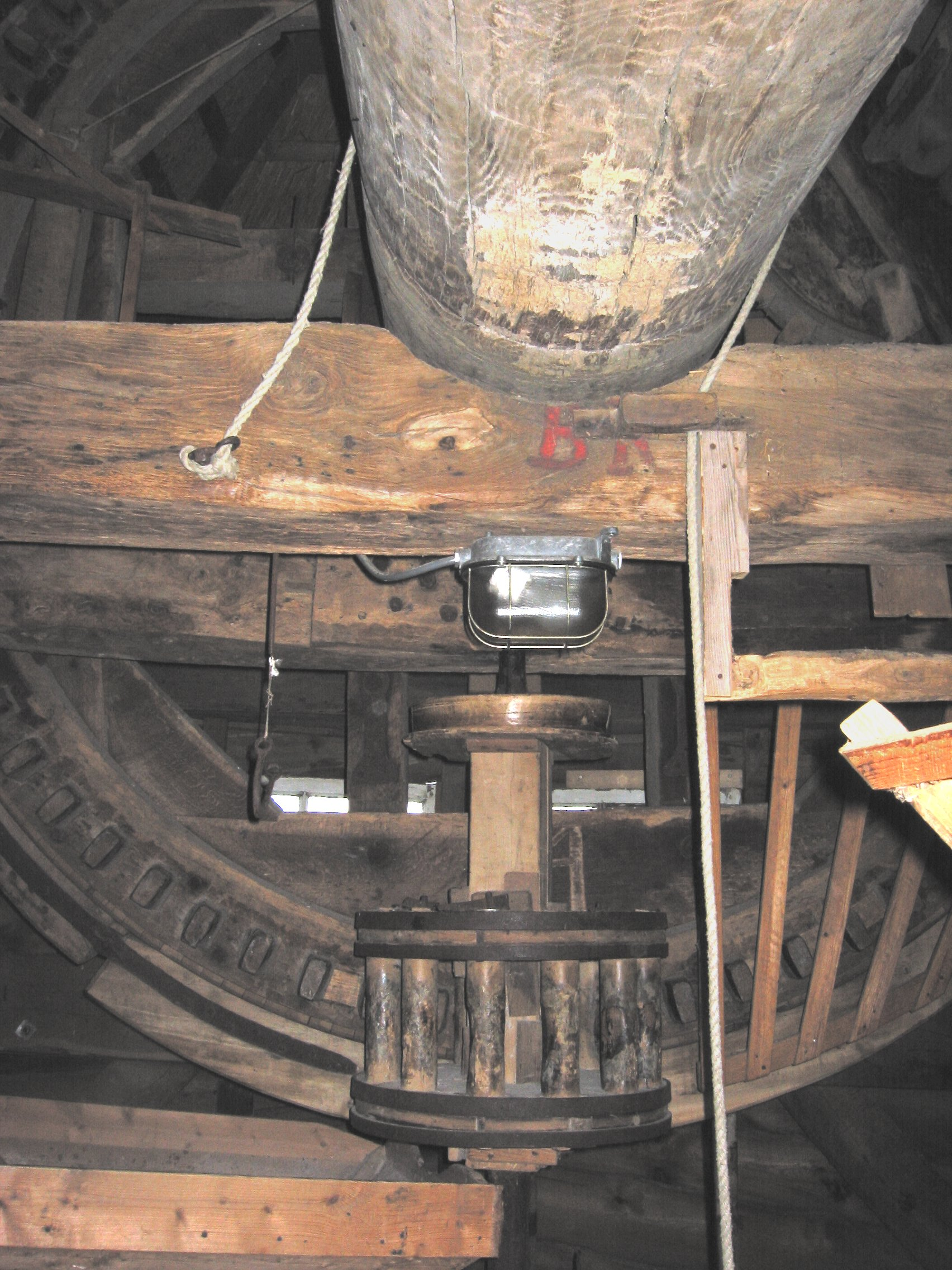
Windmill drive gears of the Doesburgermolen in Ede, Netherlands.

The geometric requirement that ensures smooth movement of contacting gear teeth is known as the fundamental law of gearing. This law states that for two bodies rotating about separate centers and in contact along their profiles, the relative angular velocity of the two will be constant as long as the line perpendicular to the point of contact of their two profiles, the profile normal, passes through the same point along the line between their centers throughout their movement. A pair of tooth profiles that satisfy the fundamental law of gearing are said to be conjugate to each other. The involute profile that is used for most gear teeth today is self-conjugate, which means that if the teeth of two gears are the same size then they will mesh smoothly independent of the diameters of the mating gears.

The relative movement of gears with conjugate tooth profiles is defined by the distance from the center of each gear to the point at which the profile normal intersects the line of centers. This is known as the radius of the pitch circle for each gear. The calculation of the speed ratios for a gear train with conjugate gear teeth becomes a calculation using the ratios of the radii of the pitch circles that make up the gear train.

Gear train design uses the desired speed ratio for a system of gears to select the number of gears, their configuration, and the size of their pitch circles. This is independent of the selection of the gear teeth as long as the tooth profiles are conjugate, with the exception that the circumferences of the pitch circles must provide for a whole number of teeth.
