= Fine adjustment screw =

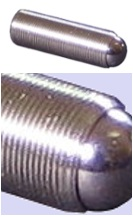
100 TPI threaded screw

A fine adjustment screw is a screw with threads between 40 and 100 threads per inch (TPI); 0.5–0.2 mm pitch. An ultra-fine adjustment screw has 100–508 TPI (0.2–0.05 mm pitch). Even though these are non-standard threads, both ISO metric screw thread designations and UNC designations have been used to call out thread dimensions and fit (class). A typical use for a fine adjustment screw is in an optical mirror mount as an adjuster. Typically, 80 TPI screws are used in mirror mounts. Ultra-fine adjustment screws are used in applications requiring extremely fine motion, like laser alignment and fiber coupling.

Fine and ultra-fine adjustment screws are often used in photonics applications as part of purchased equipment such as mirror mounts, or built into lab-made apparatus. Often, screws are purchased with matching bushings to be integrated into an experiment or a commercial product. Fine adjustment screws and mirror mounts are available as standard items from most companies that sell optics hardware.

== Explanation ==
The fine motion can most easily be calculated by using the pitch or TPI to determine how many micrometres per revolution the screw moves. The table below shows some common examples:

TPI (Threads per Inch)	Pitch (in/revolution)	Pitch (mm/revolution)	Pitch (μm/revolution)
40	0.0250	0.635	635
80	0.0125	0.318	318
100	0.0100	0.254	254
127	0.0079	0.200	200
200	0.0050	0.127	127
254	0.0039	0.100	100
508	0.00197	0.050	50

A screw turns 360° in one revolution, and with well-made screws (minimal stiction) and a user with a sensitive touch, 1° movements can be achieved. Thus, with the ultra-fine adjusters, sub-micron motions are attainable.

== Materials ==
=== Screws ===
Rigidity is crucial to ensure precision and reliability; thus, the material of choice for producing these screws is stainless steel, typically 18-8 (303). At the tip of the screw, most commonly a stainless steel ball is either pressed or glued into place to provide a single point contact for the surface being moved. Common usage has shown the glue method of attaching the ball to be troublesome in many applications as some commonly used glues, such as Super Glue, tend to outgas and degrade over time in this application.

=== Nut/bushing ===
Each screw requires a nut/bushing, which is critical in not only the length and class of the nut/bushing but also the material itself. In low-cost adjusters where grease can be used and wear and load is small, brass is typically the most economical material to use. In high-end adjusters where tight tolerances are required as well as the capability to withstand wear and higher load, phosphor bronze is the preferred material. Phosphor bronze is considered a self-lubricating material that makes it ideal for grease-free applications, such as those in a vacuum. Still, the use of grease will extend the lifetime of the nut/bushing and is recommended unless a grease-free version is required.

== Finer adjusters ==
It is difficult to make screw threads finer than about 250 TPI. As of 2015, only a small handful of companies have the ability to consistently construct threads this fine. For applications that require still-finer control, other solutions have been introduced:

Differential adjusters
These adjusters attain a smaller motion than possible from one thread alone by using the difference between the motions of two nuts moving simultaneously along two different thread pitches on one axle. There are many commercially available versions of these at prices from many times that of the fine threads and bushing alone. With this solution, backlash is often a problem as backlash from the two threads combines additively.
Sub-micron adjusters
These use a lever configuration or cone configuration to divide the motion of a screw. These can be engineered to minimize backlash. Prices are similar to differential adjusters.
