= Absement =

Measure of sustained displacement of an object from a reference position

- When an object moves, its motion can be described by absement, the time-integral of displacement, as well as the time-derivatives of displacement, e.g. velocity and acceleration.
- Common symbols: A
- SI unit: metre-second
- In SI base units: m·s
- Dimension: L T

Integrals and derivatives of displacement, including absement, as well as integrals and derivatives of energy, including actergy. (Janzen et al. 2014)

In kinematics, absement is a measure of sustained displacement of an object from a reference position, i.e. a measure of how far away and for how long. The word absement is a portmanteau of the words absence and displacement.

Absement changes as an object remains displaced and stays constant as the object resides at the reference position. It is the first time-integral of the displacement (i.e. absement is the area under a displacement vs. time graph), so the displacement is the rate of change (first time-derivative) of the absement. The dimension of absement is length multiplied by time. Its SI unit is meter second (m·s), which corresponds to an object having been displaced by 1 meter for 1 second. This is not to be confused with a meter per second (m/s), a unit of velocity, the time-derivative of position.

For example, opening the gate of a gate valve (of rectangular cross section) by 1 mm for 10 seconds yields the same absement of 10 mm·s as opening it by 5 mm for 2 seconds. The amount of water having flowed through it is linearly proportional to the absement of the gate, so it is also the same in both cases.

== Occurrence in nature ==
Whenever the rate of change f′ of a quantity f is proportional to the displacement of an object, the quantity f is a linear function of the object's absement. For example, when the fuel flow rate is proportional to the position of the throttle lever, then the total amount of fuel consumed is proportional to the lever's absement.

The first published paper on the topic of absement introduced and motivated it as a way to study flow-based musical instruments, such as the hydraulophone, to model empirical observations of some hydraulophones in which obstruction of a water jet for a longer period of time resulted in a buildup in sound level, as water accumulates in a sounding mechanism (reservoir), up to a certain maximum filling point beyond which the sound level reached a maximum, or fell off (along with a slow decay when a water jet was unblocked). Absement has also been used to model artificial muscles, as well as for real muscle interaction in a physical fitness context. Absement has also been used to model human posture.

As the displacement can be seen as a mechanical analogue of electric charge, the absement can be seen as a mechanical analogue of the time-integrated charge, a quantity useful for modelling some types of memory elements.

== Applications ==
In addition to modeling fluid flow and for Lagrangian modeling of electric circuits, absement is used in physical fitness and kinesiology to model muscle bandwidth, and as a new form of physical fitness training. In this context, it gives rise to a new quantity called actergy, which is to energy as energy is to power. Actergy has the same units as action (joule-seconds) but is the time-integral of total energy (time-integral of the Hamiltonian rather than time-integral of the Lagrangian). Just as displacement and its derivatives form kinematics, so do displacement and its integrals form "integral kinematics".

== Relation to PID controllers ==
PID controllers are controllers that work on a signal that is proportional to a physical quantity (e.g. displacement, proportional to position) and its integral(s) and derivative(s), thusly defining PID in the context of integrals and derivatives of a position of a control element in the Bratland sense:

depending on the type of sensor inputs, PID controllers can contain gains proportional to position, velocity, acceleration or the time integral of position (absement)…

Example of PID controller:

- P, position;
- I, absement;
- D, velocity.

== Strain absement ==
Strain absement is the time-integral of strain, and is used extensively in mechanical systems and memsprings. As Pei et al. describe:

... [but] these newer models deserve deeper study, in part because of a little-studied quantity called absement which allows mem-spring models to display hysteretic response in great abundance.

== Anglement ==
Absement originally arose in situations involving valves and fluid flow, for which the opening of a valve was by a long, T-shaped handle, which actually varied in angle rather than position. The time-integral of angle is called "anglement" and it is approximately equal or proportional to absement for small angles, because the sine of an angle is approximately equal to the angle for small angles.

Building on the concept of anglement, "Einstein's Lane Method" could be used to describe the spatiotemporal trajectory of systems involving rotational motion or angular displacement. Einstein’s Lane Method provides a framework for analyzing the curved paths of rotating objects or systems under the influence of gravitational fields, similar to how general relativity describes the bending of spacetime. This method would use angular displacements (rather than linear positions) as key variables, integrating them over time, much like the time-integral of angle in anglement.

== Phase space: Absement and momentement ==
In regard to a conjugate variable for absement, the time-integral of momentum, known as momentement, has been proposed.

This is consistent with Jeltsema's 2012 treatment with charge and flux as the base units rather than current and voltage.

Linear/translational quantities				Angular/rotational quantities			
Dimensions	1	L	L^{2}	Dimensions	1	θ	θ^{2}
T	time: t s	absement: A m s		T	time: t s		
1		distance: d, position: r, s, x, displacement: d m	area: A m^{2}	1		angle: θ, angular displacement: θ rad	solid angle: Ω rad^{2}, sr
T^{−1}	frequency: f s^{−1}, Hz	speed: v, velocity: v m s^{−1}	kinematic viscosity: ν, specific angular momentum: h m^{2} s^{−1}	T^{−1}	frequency: f, rotational speed: n, rotational velocity: n s^{−1}, Hz	angular speed: ω, angular velocity: ω rad s^{−1}	
T^{−2}		acceleration: a m s^{−2}		T^{−2}	rotational acceleration s^{−2}	angular acceleration: α rad s^{−2}	
T^{−3}		jerk: j m s^{−3}		T^{−3}		angular jerk: ζ rad s^{−3}	
M	mass: m kg	weighted position: M ⟨x⟩ = ∑ m x	moment of inertia: I kg m^{2}	ML			
MT^{−1}	Mass flow rate: $\dot{m}$ kg s^{−1}	momentum: p, impulse: J kg m s^{−1}, N s	action: 𝒮, actergy: ℵ kg m^{2} s^{−1}, J s	MLT^{−1}		angular momentum: L, angular impulse: ΔL kg m rad s^{−1}	
MT^{−2}		force: F, weight: F_{g} kg m s^{−2}, N	energy: E, work: W, Lagrangian: L kg m^{2} s^{−2}, J	MLT^{−2}		torque: τ, moment: M kg m rad s^{−2}, N m	
MT^{−3}		yank: Y kg m s^{−3}, N s^{−1}	power: P kg m^{2} s^{−3}, W	MLT^{−3}		rotatum: P kg m rad s^{−3}, N m s^{−1}	
