= Micrometer (device) =

Tool for the precise measurement of a component's length, width, and/or depth

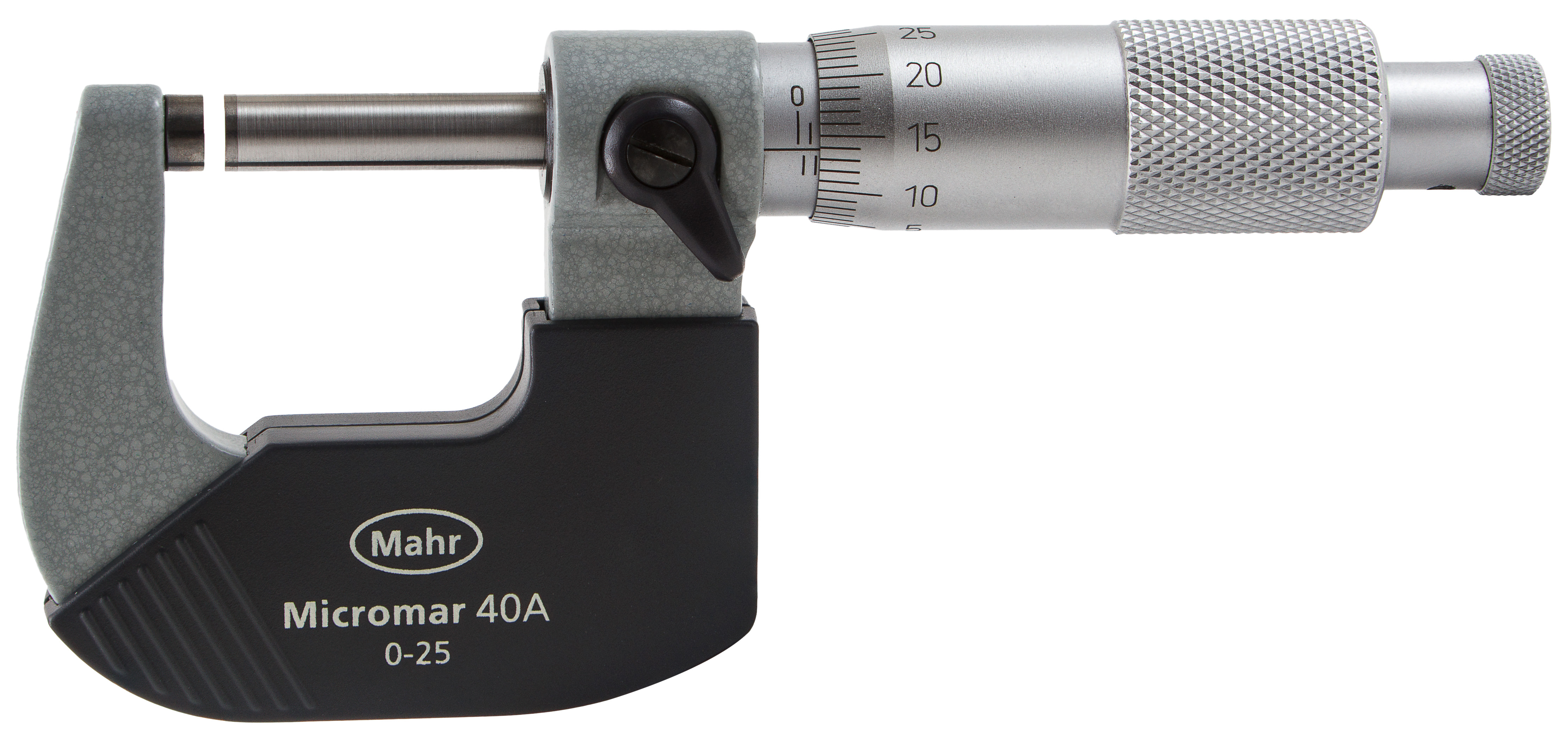
Modern micrometer with a reading of 1.639 ± 0.005 mm. Assuming no zero error, this is also the measurement. (One may need to enlarge the image to read it.)

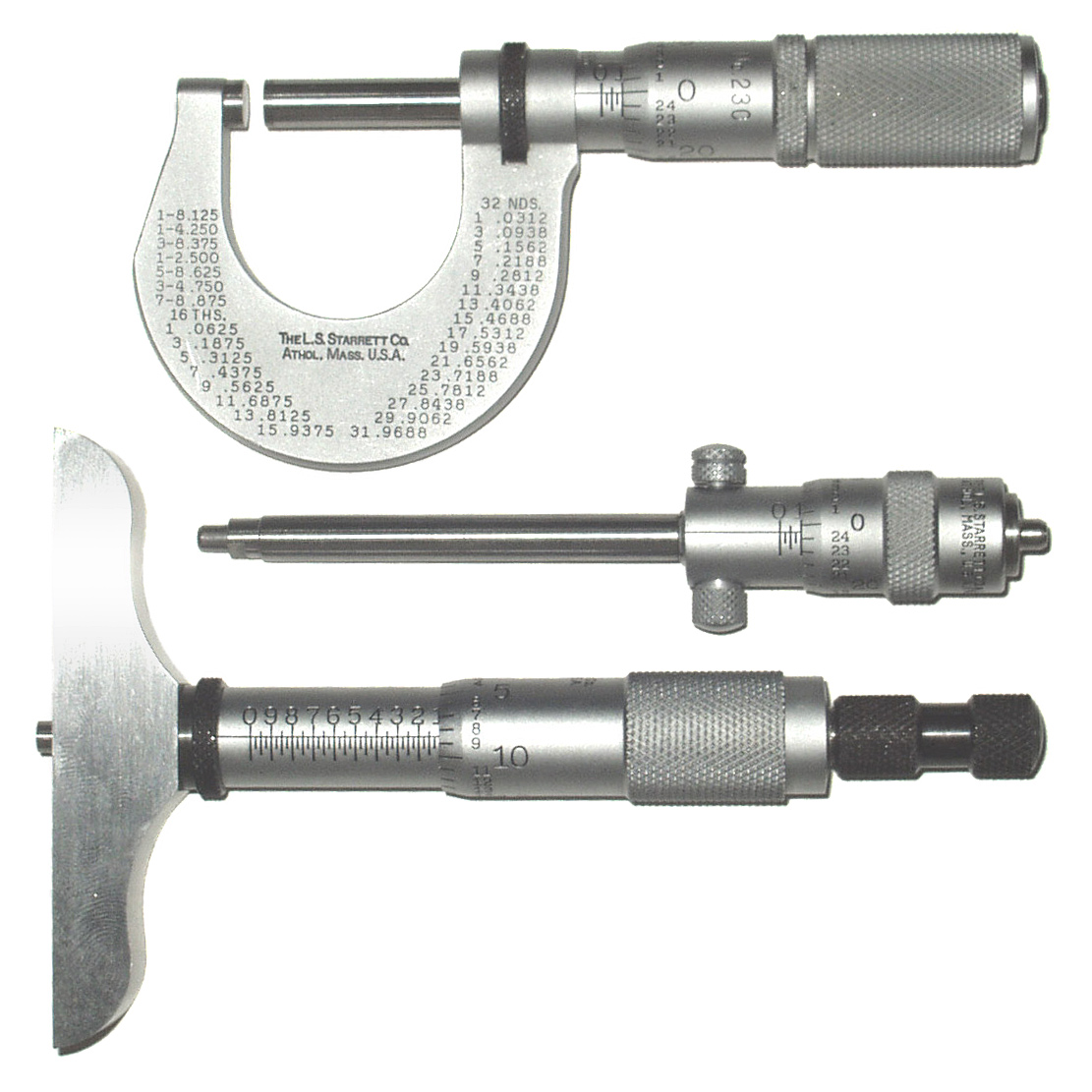
Outside, inside, and depth micrometers. The outside micrometer has a unit conversion chart between fractional and decimal inch measurements etched onto the frame.

A micrometer (/maɪˈkrɒmɪtər/ my-KROM-it-ər), sometimes known as a micrometer screw gauge (MSG), is a device incorporating a calibrated screw for accurate measurement of the size of components. It is widely used in mechanical engineering, machining, metrology and most mechanical trades, along with other dimensional instruments such as dial, vernier, and digital calipers. Micrometers are usually, but not always, in the form of calipers (opposing ends joined by a frame). The spindle is a very accurately machined screw and the object to be measured is placed between the spindle and the anvil. The spindle is moved by turning the ratchet knob or thimble until the object to be measured is lightly touched by both the spindle and the anvil.

== History ==
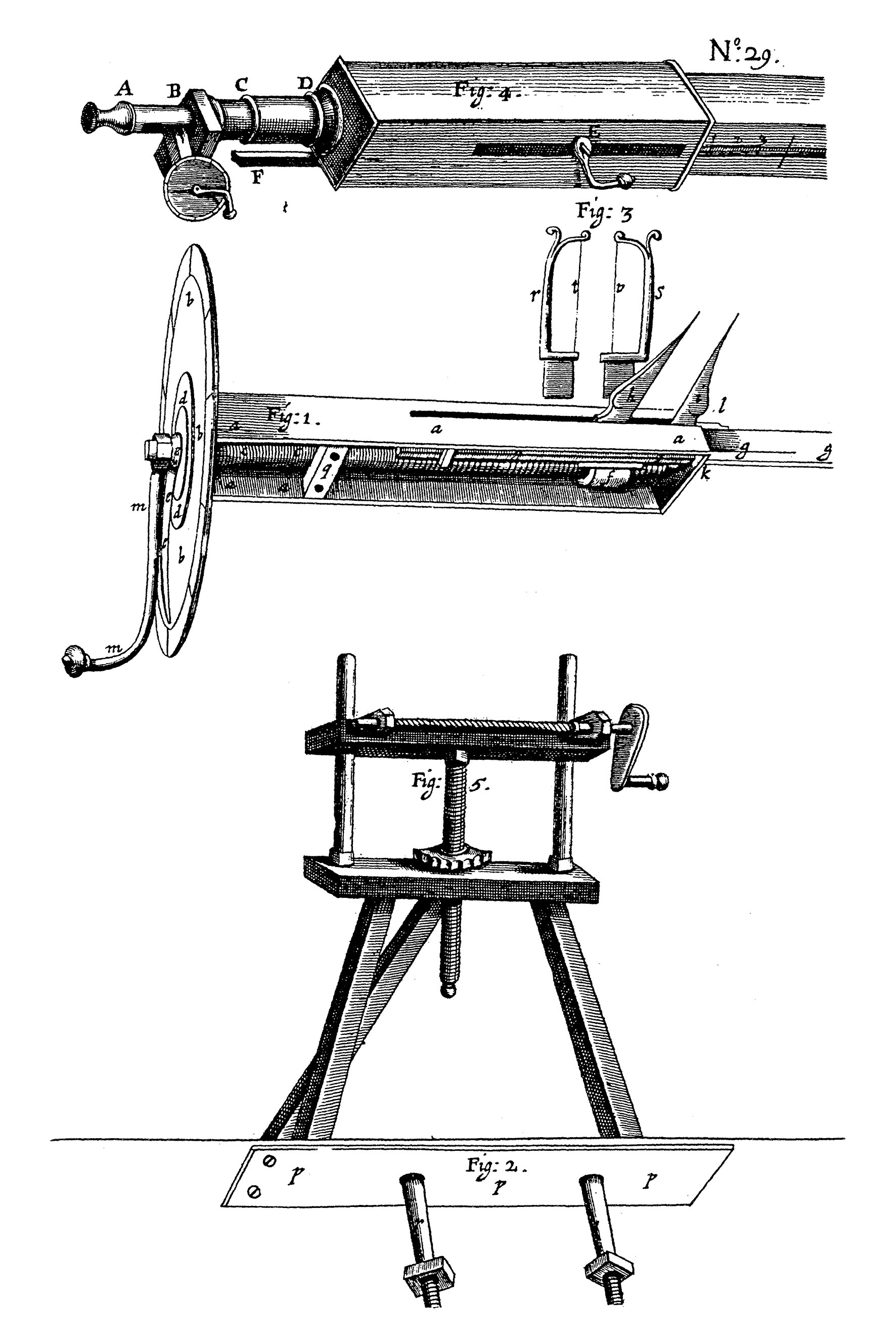
Gascoigne's Micrometer, as drawn by Robert Hooke, c. 1668

The word micrometer is a neoclassical coinage from Greek: μικρός, romanized: micros, lit. 'small' and Greek: μέτρον, romanized: metron, lit. 'measure'. According to the Merriam-Webster Collegiate Dictionary, the word was loaned to English from French, with its first known appearance in English writing being in 1670. Neither the metre nor the micrometre (μm) nor the micrometer (device) as we know them today existed at that time. However, the people of that time did have much need for, and interest in, the ability to measure small things and small differences. The word was no doubt coined in reference to this endeavor, even if it did not refer specifically to its present-day senses.

The London Science Museum contains an exhibit "James Watt's end measuring instrument with micrometer screw, 1776" which the science museum claims is probably the first screw micrometer made. This instrument is intended to measure items very accurately by placing them between the two anvils and then advancing one using a fine micrometer screw until both are in contact with the object, the distance between them being precisely recorded on the two dials. However, as the science museum notes, there is a possibility that this instrument was not made c.1776 by Watt, but 1876 when it was placed in that year's Special Loan Exhibition of scientific instruments in South Kensington.

Henry Maudslay built a bench micrometer in the early 19th century that was jocularly nicknamed "the Lord Chancellor" among his staff because it was the final judge on measurement accuracy and precision in the firm's work. In 1844, details of Whitworth's workshop micrometer were published. This was described as having a strong frame of cast iron, the opposite ends of which were two highly finished steel cylinders, which traversed longitudinally by action of screws. The ends of the cylinders where they met was of hemispherical shape. One screw was fitted with a wheel graduated to measure to the ten thousandth of an inch. His object was to furnish ordinary mechanics with an instrument which, while it afforded very accurate indications, was yet not very liable to be deranged by the rough handling of the workshop.

The first documented development of handheld micrometer-screw calipers was by Jean Laurent Palmer of Paris in 1848; the device is therefore often called palmer in French, tornillo de Palmer ("Palmer screw") in Spanish, and calibro Palmer ("Palmer caliper") in Italian. (Those languages also use the micrometer cognates: micromètre, micrómetro, micrometro.) The micrometer caliper was introduced to the mass market in anglophone countries by Brown & Sharpe in 1867, allowing the penetration of the instrument's use into the average machine shop. Brown & Sharpe were inspired by several earlier devices, one of them being Palmer's design. In 1888, Edward W. Morley added to the precision of micrometric measurements and proved their accuracy in a complex series of experiments.

The culture of toolroom accuracy and precision, which started with interchangeability pioneers including Gribeauval, Tousard, North, Hall, Whitney, and Colt, and continued through leaders such as Maudslay, Palmer, Whitworth, Brown, Sharpe, Pratt, Whitney, Leland, Johansson, and others, grew during the Machine Age to become an important part of combining applied science with technology. Beginning in the early 20th century, one could no longer truly master tool and die making, machine tool building, or engineering without some knowledge of the science of metrology, as well as the sciences of chemistry and physics (for metallurgy, kinematics/dynamics, and quality).

== Types ==
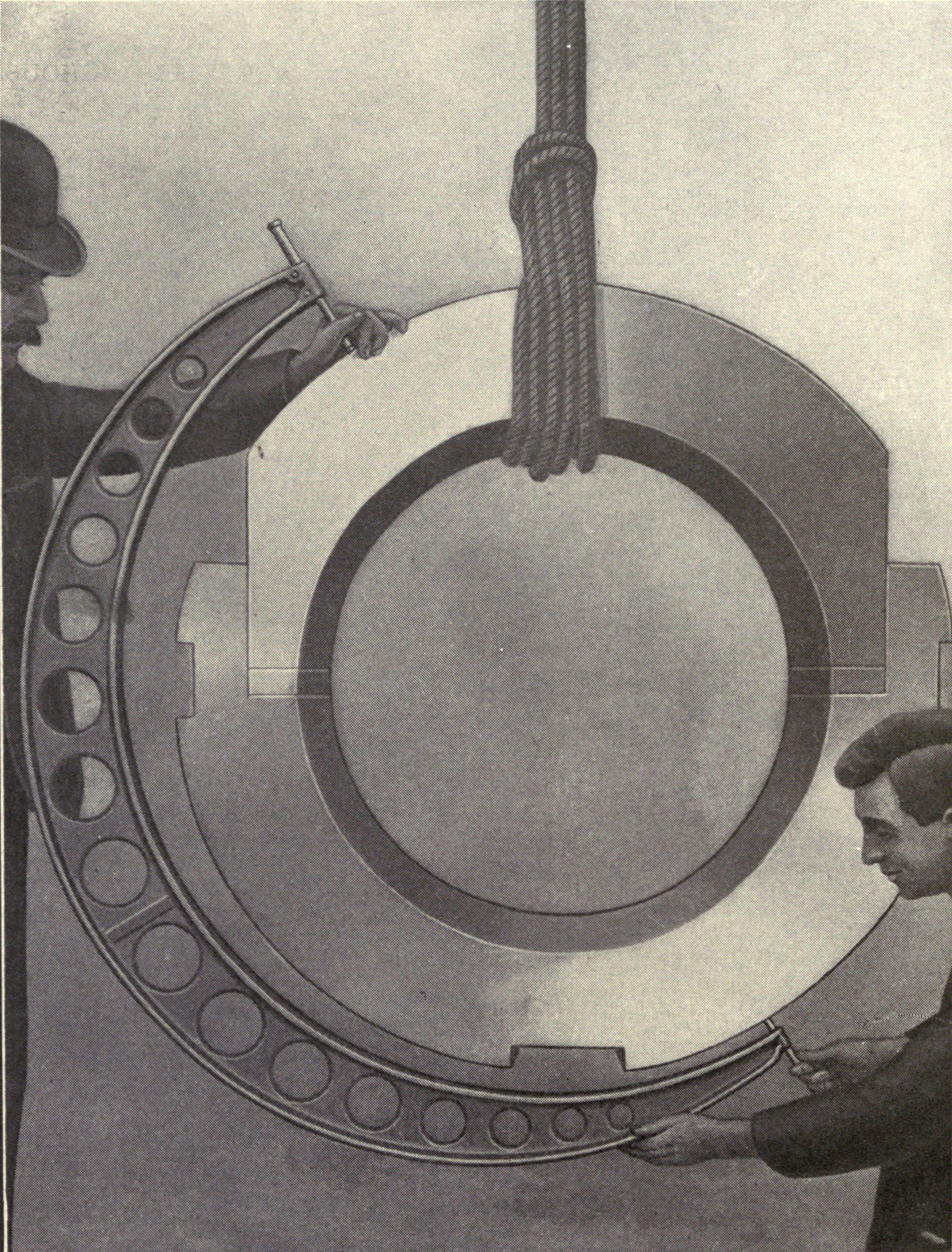
Large micrometer caliper, 1908

=== Specialized types ===
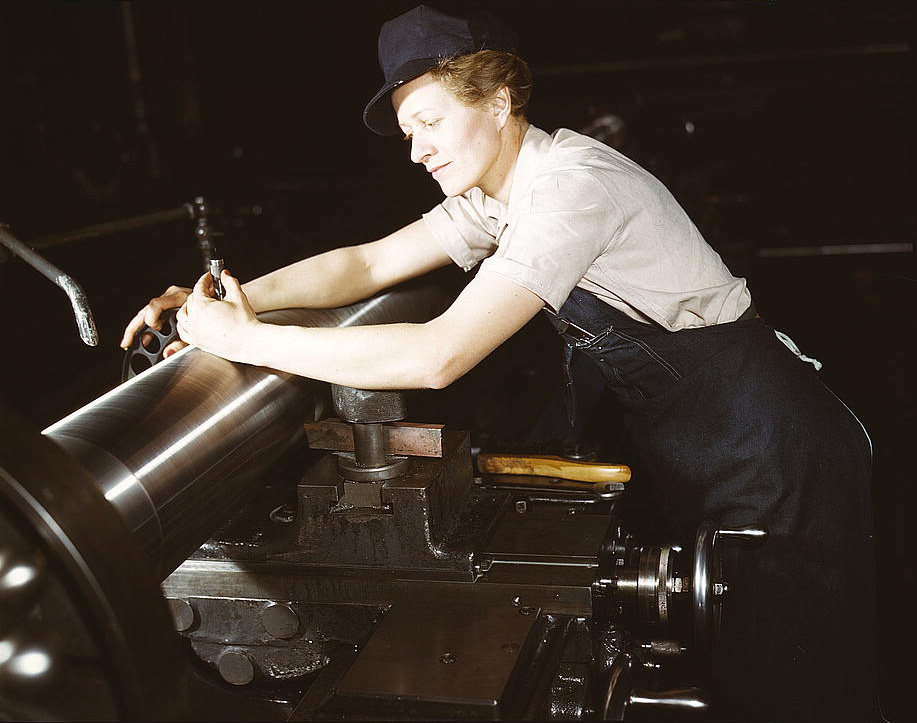
Another large micrometer in use

Each type of micrometer caliper can be fitted with specialized anvils and spindle tips for particular measuring tasks. For example, the anvil may be shaped in the form of a segment of screw thread, in the form of a v-block, or in the form of a large disc.

- Universal micrometer sets come with interchangeable anvils, such as flat, spherical, spline, disk, blade, point, and knife-edge. The term universal micrometer may also refer to a type of micrometer whose frame has modular components, allowing one micrometer to function as outside mic, depth mic, step mic, etc. (often known by the brand names Mul-T-Anvil and Uni-Mike).
- Blade micrometers have a matching set of narrow tips (blades). They allow, for example, the measuring of a narrow o-ring groove.
- Pitch-diameter micrometers (a.k.a. thread mics) have a matching set of thread-shaped tips for measuring the pitch diameter of screw threads.
- Limit mics have two anvils and two spindles, and are used like a snap gauge. The part being checked must pass through the first gap and must stop at the second gap in order to be within specification. The two gaps accurately reflect the top and bottom of the tolerance range.
- Bore micrometer, typically a three-anvil head on a micrometer base used to accurately measure inside diameters.
- Tube micrometers have a cylindrical anvil positioned perpendicularly to a spindle and is used to measure the thickness of tubes.
- Micrometer stops are micrometer heads that are mounted on the table of a manual milling machine, bedways of a lathe, or other machine tool, in place of simple stops. They help the operator to position the table or carriage precisely. Stops can also be used to actuate kickout mechanisms or limit switches to halt an automatic feed system.
- Ball micrometers have ball-shaped (spherical) anvils. They may have one flat and one ball anvil, in which case they are used for measuring tube wall thickness, distance of a hole to an edge, and other distances where one anvil must be placed against a rounded surface. They differ in application from tube micrometers in that they may be used to measure against rounded surfaces which are not tubes, but the ball anvil may also not be able to fit into smaller tubes as easily as a tube micrometer. Ball micrometers with a pair of balls can be used when single-tangential-point contact is desired on both sides. The most common example is in measuring the pitch diameter of screw threads (which is also done with conical anvils or the 3-wire method, the latter of which uses similar geometry as the pair-of-balls approach).
- Bench micrometers are tools for inspection use whose accuracy and precision are around half a micrometre (20 millionths of an inch, "a fifth of a tenth" in machinist jargon) and whose repeatability is around a quarter micrometre ("a tenth of a tenth"). An example is the Pratt & Whitney Supermicrometer brand.
- Digit mics are the type with mechanical digits that roll over.
- Digital mics are the type that uses an encoder to detect the distance and displays the result on a digital screen.
- V mics are outside mics with a small V-block for an anvil. They are useful for measuring the diameter of a circle from three points evenly spaced around it (versus the two points of a standard outside micrometer). An example of when this is necessary is measuring the diameter of 3-flute endmills and twist drills.

== Operating principles ==
Animation of a micrometer in use. The object being measured is in black. The measurement is 4.140 ± 0.005 mm.

Micrometers use the screw to transform small distances (that are too small to measure directly) into large rotations of the screw that are big enough to read from a scale. The accuracy of a micrometer derives from the accuracy of the thread-forms that are central to the core of its design. In some cases it is a differential screw. The basic operating principles of a micrometer are as follows:

1. The amount of rotation of an accurately made screw can be directly and precisely correlated to a certain amount of axial movement (and vice versa), through the constant known as the screw's lead (/ˈliːd/). A screw's lead is the distance it moves forward axially with one complete turn (360°). (In most threads [that is, in all single-start threads], lead and pitch refer to essentially the same concept.)
2. With an appropriate lead and major diameter of the screw, a given amount of axial movement will be amplified in the resulting circumferential movement.

For example, if the lead of a screw is 1 mm, but the major diameter (here, outer diameter) is 10 mm, then the circumference of the screw is 10π, or about 31.4 mm. Therefore, an axial movement of 1 mm is amplified (magnified) to a circumferential movement of 31.4 mm. This amplification allows a small difference in the sizes of two similar measured objects to correlate to a larger difference in the position of a micrometer's thimble. In some micrometers, even greater accuracy is obtained by using a differential screw adjuster to move the thimble in much smaller increments than a single thread would allow.

In classic-style analog micrometers, the position of the thimble is read directly from scale markings on the thimble and sleeve (for names of parts see next section). A vernier scale is often included, which allows the position to be read to a fraction of the smallest scale mark. In digital micrometers, an electronic readout displays the length digitally on an LCD on the instrument. There also exist mechanical-digit versions, like the style of car odometers where the numbers "roll over".

== Parts ==
Diagram of a micrometer showing a measurement of 7.145 mm ± 0.005 mm

A micrometer is composed of:

1. Anvil: The shiny part that the spindle moves toward, and that the sample rests against.
2. Spindle: The shiny cylindrical component that the thimble causes to move toward the anvil.
3. Ratchet stop: Device on end of handle that limits applied pressure by slipping at a calibrated torque.
4. Sleeve, barrel, or stock: The stationary round component with the linear scale on it, sometimes with vernier markings. In some instruments the scale is marked on a tight-fitting but movable cylindrical sleeve fitting over the internal fixed barrel. This allows zeroing to be done by slightly altering the position of the sleeve.
5. Frame: The C-shaped body that holds the anvil and barrel in constant relation to each other. It is thick because it needs to minimize flexion, expansion, and contraction, which would distort the measurement.
  The frame is heavy and consequently has a high thermal mass, to prevent substantial heating up by the holding hand/fingers. It is often covered by insulating plastic plates which further reduce heat transference. Explanation: if one holds the frame long enough so that it heats up by 10 °C, then the increase in length of any 10 cm linear piece of steel is of magnitude 1/100 mm. For micrometers this is their typical accuracy range. Micrometers typically have a specified temperature at which the measurement is correct (often 20 °C [68 °F], which is generally considered "room temperature" in a room with HVAC). Toolrooms are generally kept at 20 °C [68 °F].
6. Thimble scale: Rotating graduated markings.
7. Lock nut, lock-ring, or thimble lock: The knurled component (or lever) that one can tighten to hold the spindle stationary, such as when momentarily holding a measurement.
8. Thimble: The component that one's thumb turns.
9. Screw: (Not visible) The heart of the micrometer, as explained under "Operating principles". It is inside the barrel. This references the fact that the usual name for the device in German is Messschraube, literally "measuring screw".

== Reading ==
Micrometers are high precision instruments. Proper use of them requires not only understanding their operation itself but also the nature of the object and the dynamic between the instrument and the object as it is being measured. For simplicity's sake, in the figures and text below issues related to deformation or definition of the length being measured are assumed to be negligible unless otherwise stated.

=== Customary/Imperial system ===
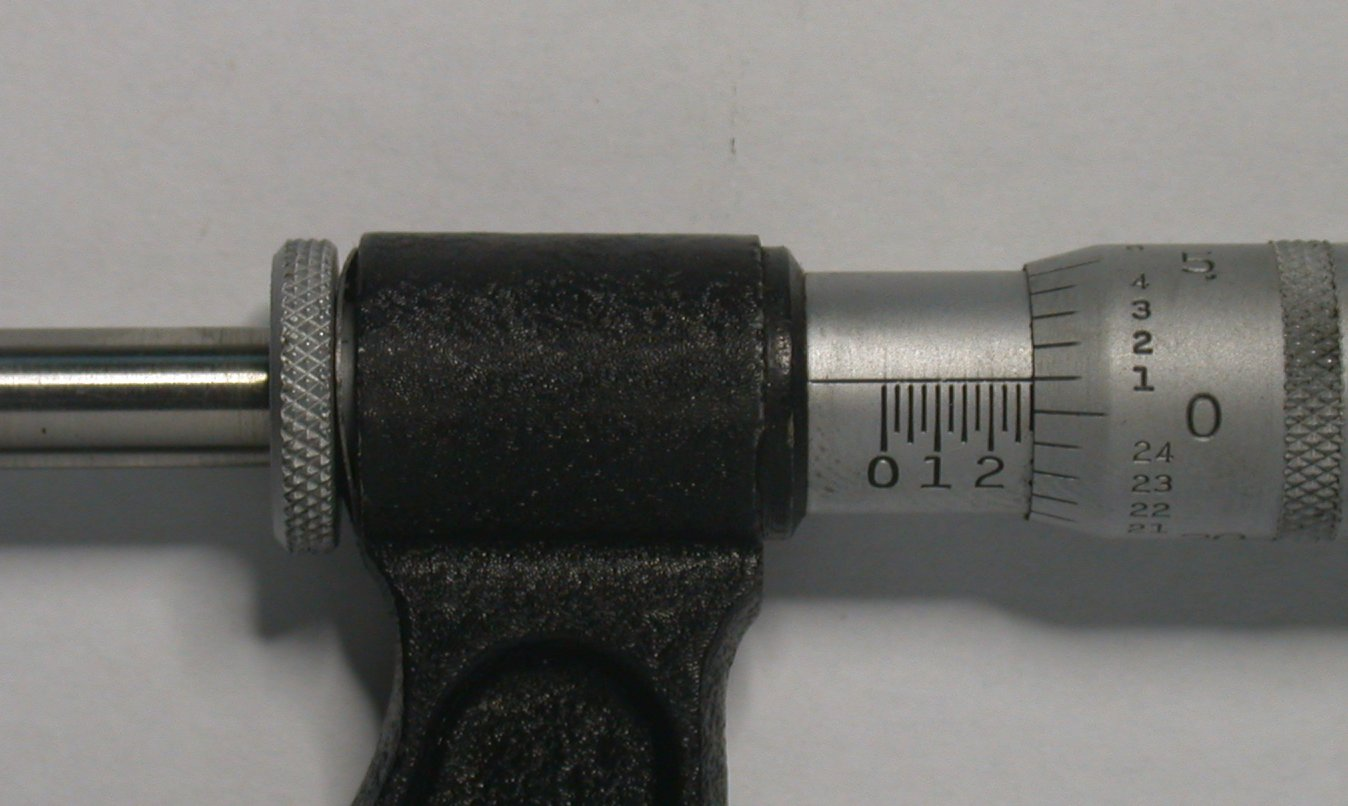
Imperial unit micrometer thimble showing a reading of 0.2760 in. The main scale reads 0.275 in (exact) plus 0.0010 in (estimated) on the secondary scale (the last zero is an estimated tenth). The reading would be 0.2760 ± 0.0005 in, which includes plus/minus half the width of the smallest ruling as the error. Here it has been assumed that there is no zero point error (often untrue in practice).

The spindle of a micrometer graduated for the Imperial and US customary measurement systems has 40 threads per inch, so that one turn moves the spindle axially 0.025 inch (1 ÷ 40 = 0.025), equal to the distance between adjacent graduations on the sleeve. The 25 graduations on the thimble allow the 0.025 inch to be further divided, so that turning the thimble through one division moves the spindle axially 0.001 inch (0.025 ÷ 25 = 0.001). Thus, the reading is given by the number of whole divisions that are visible on the scale of the sleeve, multiplied by 25 (the number of thousandths of an inch that each division represents), plus the number of that division on the thimble which coincides with the axial zero line on the sleeve. The result will be the diameter expressed in thousandths of an inch. As the numbers 1, 2, 3, etc., appear below every fourth sub-division on the sleeve, indicating hundreds of thousandths, the reading can easily be taken.

Suppose the thimble were screwed out so that graduation 2, and three additional sub-divisions, were visible on the sleeve (as shown in the image), and that graduation 1 on the thimble coincided with the axial line on the sleeve. The reading would then be 0.200 + 0.075 + 0.001, or 0.276 inch.

=== Metric system ===
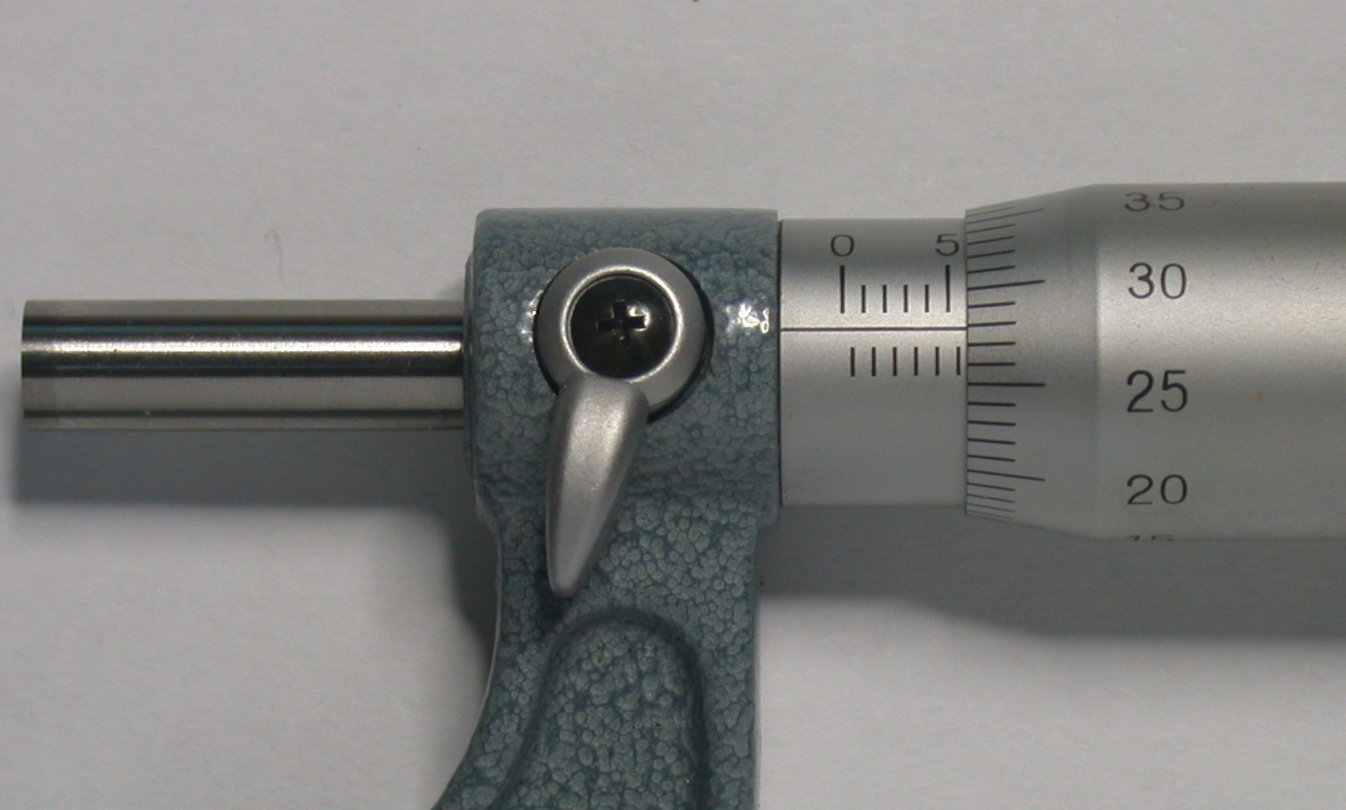
Micrometer thimble with a reading of 5.779 ± 0.005 mm. (You must enlarge the image to be able to read the scale to its fullest precision.) The reading consists of exactly 5.5 mm from the main scale plus an estimated 0.279 mm from the secondary scale. Assuming no zero error, this is also the measurement.

The spindle of an ordinary metric micrometer has 2 threads per millimetre, and thus one complete revolution moves the spindle through a distance of 0.5 millimetres. The longitudinal line on the sleeve is graduated with 1 millimetre divisions and 0.5 millimetre subdivisions. The thimble has 50 graduations, each being 0.01 millimetre (one-hundredth of a millimetre). Thus, the reading is given by the number of millimetre divisions visible on the scale of the sleeve plus the division on the thimble which coincides with the axial line on the sleeve.

As shown in the image, suppose that the thimble were screwed out so that graduation 5, and one additional 0.5 subdivision were visible on the sleeve. The reading from the axial line on the sleeve almost reaches graduation 28 on the thimble. The best estimate is 27.9 graduations. The reading then would be 5.00 (exact) + 0.5 (exact) + 0.279 (estimate) = 5.779 mm (estimate). As the last digit is an "estimated tenth", both 5.780 mm and 5.778 mm are also reasonably acceptable readings but the former cannot be written as 5.78 mm or, by the rules for significant figures, it is then taken to express ten times less precision than the instrument actually has! But note that the nature of the object being measured often requires one should round the result to fewer significant figures than which the instrument is capable.

=== Vernier micrometers ===
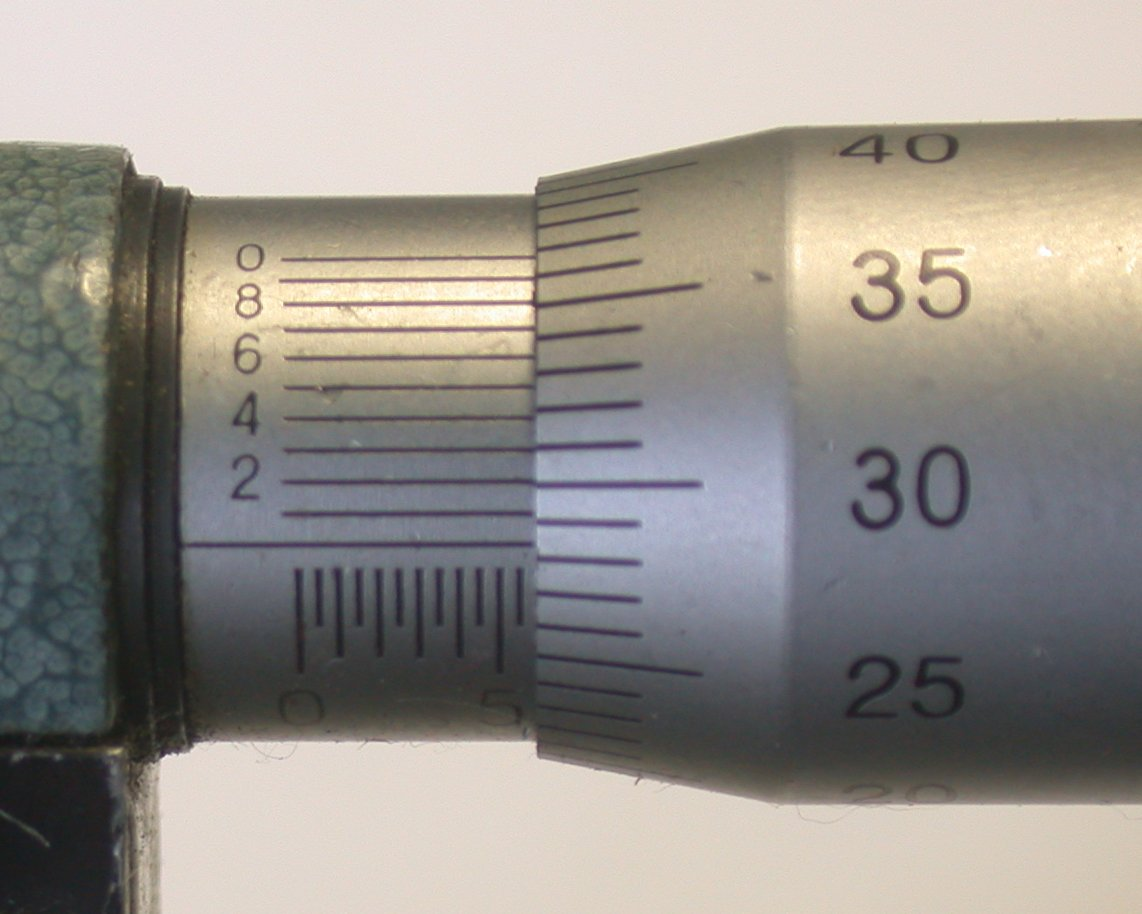
Vernier micrometer reading 5.783 ± 0.001 mm, comprising 5.5 mm on main screw lead scale, 0.28 mm on screw rotation scale, and 0.003 mm added from vernier

Some micrometers are provided with a vernier scale on the sleeve in addition to the regular graduations. These permit measurements within 0.001 millimetre to be made on metric micrometers, or 0.0001 inches on inch-system micrometers.

The additional digit of these micrometers is obtained by finding the line on the sleeve vernier scale which exactly coincides with one on the thimble. The number of this coinciding vernier line represents the additional digit.

Thus, the reading for metric micrometers of this type is the number of whole millimeters (if any) and the number of hundredths of a millimeter, as with an ordinary micrometer, and the number of thousandths of a millimeter given by the coinciding vernier line on the sleeve vernier scale.

For example, a measurement of 5.783 millimetres would be obtained by reading 5.5 millimetres on the sleeve, and then adding 0.28 millimetre as determined by the thimble. The vernier would then be used to read the 0.003 (as shown in the image).

Inch micrometers are read in a similar fashion.

Note: 0.01 millimeter = 0.000393 inch, and 0.002 millimeter = 0.000078 inch (78 millionths) or alternatively, 0.0001 inch = 0.00254 millimeters. Therefore, metric micrometers provide smaller measuring increments than comparable inch unit micrometers—the smallest graduation of an ordinary inch reading micrometer is 0.001 inch; the vernier type has graduations down to 0.0001 inch (0.00254 mm). When using either a metric or inch micrometer, without a vernier, smaller readings than those graduated may of course be obtained by visual interpolation between graduations.

== Calibration: testing and adjusting ==
=== Zeroing ===
On most micrometers, a small pin spanner is used to turn the sleeve relative to the barrel, so that its zero line is repositioned relative to the markings on the thimble. There is usually a small hole in the sleeve to accept the spanner's pin. This calibration procedure will cancel a zero error: the problem that the micrometer reads nonzero when its jaws are closed.

=== Testing ===
A standard one-inch micrometer has readout divisions of 0.001 inch and a rated accuracy of ±0.0001 inch ("one tenth", in machinist parlance). Both the measuring instrument and the object being measured should be at room temperature for an accurate measurement; dirt, operator skill issue, and misuse (or abuse) of the instrument are the main sources of error.

The accuracy of micrometers is checked by using them to measure gauge blocks, rods, or similar standards whose lengths are precisely and accurately known. If the gauge block is known to be 0.75000 ± 0.00005 inch ("seven-fifty plus or minus fifty millionths", that is, "seven hundred fifty thou plus or minus half a tenth"), then the micrometer should measure it as 0.7500 inch. If the micrometer measures 0.7503 inch, then it is out of calibration. Cleanliness and low but consistent torque are especially important when calibrating—each tenth (that is, ten-thousandth of an inch), or hundredth of a millimetre, "counts"; each is important. A mere speck of dirt, or a mere bit too much squeeze, obscures the truth of whether the instrument can read correctly. The solution is simply conscientiousness—cleaning, patience, due care and attention, and repeated measurements (good repeatability assures the calibrator that their technique is working correctly).

Calibration typically checks the error at 3 to 5 points along the range. Only one can be adjusted to zero. If the micrometer is in good condition, then they are all so near to zero that the instrument seems to read essentially "-on" all along its range; no noticeable error is seen at any locale. In contrast, on a worn-out micrometer (or one that was poorly made to begin with), one can "chase the error up and down the range", that is, move it up or down to any of various locales along the range, by adjusting the sleeve, but one cannot eliminate it from all locales at once.

Calibration can also include the condition of the tips (flat and parallel), ratchet, and linearity of the scale. Flatness and parallelism are typically measured with a gauge called an optical flat, a disc of glass or plastic ground with extreme accuracy to have flat, parallel faces, which allows light bands to be counted when the micrometer's anvil and spindle are against it, revealing their amount of geometric inaccuracy.

Commercial machine shops, especially those that do certain categories of work (military or commercial aerospace, nuclear power industry, medical, and others), are required by various standards organizations (such as ISO, ANSI, ASME, ASTM, SAE, AIA, the U.S. military, and others) to calibrate micrometers and other gauges on a schedule (often annually), to affix a label to each gauge that gives it an ID number and a calibration expiration date, to keep a record of all the gauges by ID number, and to specify in inspection reports which gauge was used for a particular measurement.

Not all calibration is an affair for metrology labs. A micrometer can be calibrated on-site anytime, at least in the most basic and important way (if not comprehensively), by measuring a high-grade gauge block and adjusting to match. Even gauges that are calibrated annually and within their expiration timeframe should be checked this way every month or two if they are used daily. They usually will check out OK as needing no adjustment.

The accuracy of the gauge blocks themselves is traceable through a chain of comparisons back to a master standard such as the international prototype of the meter. This bar of metal, like the international prototype of the kilogram, is maintained under controlled conditions at the International Bureau of Weights and Measures headquarters in France, which is one of the principal measurement standards laboratories of the world. These master standards have extreme-accuracy regional copies (kept in the national laboratories of various countries, such as NIST), and metrological equipment makes the chain of comparisons. Because the definition of the meter is now based on a light wavelength, the international prototype of the meter is not quite as indispensable as it once was. But such master gauges are still important for calibrating and certifying metrological equipment. Equipment described as "NIST traceable" means that its comparison against master gauges, and their comparison against others, can be traced back through a chain of documentation to equipment in the NIST labs. Maintaining this degree of traceability requires some expense, which is why NIST-traceable equipment is more expensive than non-NIST-traceable. But applications needing the highest degree of quality control mandate the cost.

=== Adjustment ===
A micrometer that has been zeroed and tested and found to be off might be restored to accuracy by further adjustment. If the error originates from the parts of the micrometer being worn out of shape and size, then restoration of accuracy by this means is not possible; rather, repair (grinding, lapping, or replacing of parts) is required. For standard kinds of instruments, in practice it is easier and faster, and often no more expensive, to buy a new one rather than pursue refurbishment.

== See also ==
- Filar micrometer
- Vernier scale
