= American Society for Precision Engineering =

The American Society for Precision Engineering is a non-profit member association, founded in 1986, dedicated to advancing the arts, sciences and technology of precision engineering, to promote its dissemination through education and training, and its use by science and industry.

== Overview ==
The American Society for Precision Engineering (ASPE) focuses on many areas that are important in the research, design, development, manufacture and measurement of high accuracy components and systems. This collective discipline is known as Precision engineering, and includes precision controls, metrology, interferometry, materials, materials processing, nanotechnology, optical fabrication, precision optics, precision replication, scanning microscopes, semiconductor processing, standards and ultra-precision machining.

== History ==
There has long been a "community" of precision engineers within the United States but a formal structure and common focus for the activities was lacking. This was not the case in Japan, as evidenced by the large and active Japanese Society of Precision Engineers. In November 1985, a joint US-Japanese meeting on precision engineering included a special session to discuss the possibility of forming an American Society. The enthusiasm of the participants and the overwhelming response to a subsequent questionnaire provided momentum. By November 1986, the American Society for Precision Engineering was incorporated and held its first Annual Meeting in Dallas, Texas. The theme of the well-attended meeting, "Thresholds in Precision Engineering," was reflected in 28 papers covering a broad spectrum of applications. At this meeting, a Board of Directors was elected with members drawn from industry, private laboratories, government and academia.

ASPE emphasizes the foundations necessary to achieve precision in any application and seeks to bring together practitioners from all of the related fields. The Annual Meeting, held each fall, presents topics spanning the field of precision engineering.

== Conferences and exhibitions ==
- 1st Annual Meeting, Dallas, Texas, November 1986
- 2nd Annual Meeting, Columbus, Ohio, November 1987
- 3rd Annual Meeting, Atlanta, Georgia, October 1988
- 4th Annual Meeting, Monterey, California, September 1989
- 5th Annual Meeting, Raleigh, North Carolina, September 1990
- 6th Annual Meeting, Santa Fe, New Mexico, October 1991
- 7th Annual Meeting, Grenelefe, Florida, October 1992
- 8th Annual Meeting, Seattle, Washington, November 1993
- 9th Annual Meeting, Cincinnati, Ohio, October 1994
- 10th Annual Meeting, Austin, Texas, October 1995
- 11th Annual Meeting, Monterey, California, November 1996
- 12th Annual Meeting, Norfolk, Virginia, October 1997
- 13th Annual Meeting, St. Louis, Missouri, October 1998
- 14th Annual Meeting, Monterey, California, October 1999
- 15th Annual Meeting, Scottsdale, Arizona, October 2000
- 16th Annual Meeting, Crystal City, Virginia, November 2001
- 17th Annual Meeting, St. Louis, Missouri, October 2002
- 18th Annual Meeting, Portland, Oregon, October 2003
- 19th Annual Meeting, Orlando, Florida, October 2004
- 20th Annual Meeting, Norfolk, Virginia, October 2005
- 21st Annual Meeting, Monterey, California, October 2006
- 22nd Annual Meeting, Dallas, Texas, October 2007
- 23rd Annual Meeting, Portland, Oregon, October 2008
- 24th Annual Meeting, Monterey, California, October 2009
- 25th Annual Meeting, Atlanta, Georgia, October/November 2010
- 26th Annual Meeting, Denver, Colorado, October 2011
- 27th Annual Meeting, San Diego, California, October 2012
- 28th Annual Meeting, St. Paul, Minnesota, October 2013
- 29th Annual Meeting, Boston, Massachusetts, November 2014
- 30th Annual Meeting, Austin, Texas, November 2015
- 31st Annual Meeting, Portland, Oregon, October 2016
- 32nd Annual Meeting, Charlotte, North Carolina, October/November 2017
- 33rd Annual Meeting, Las Vegas, Nevada, November 2018
- 34th Annual Meeting, Pittsburgh, Pennsylvania, October/November 2019
- 35th Annual Meeting, Virtual, October 2020
- 36th Annual Meeting, Minneapolis, Minnesota, November 2021
- 37th Annual Meeting, Bellevue, Washington, October 2022
- 38th Annual Meeting, Boston, Massachusetts, November 2023
- 39th Annual Meeting, Houston, Texas, November 2024
- 40th Annual Meeting, San Diego, California, November 2025
- 41st Annual Meeting, Norfolk, Virginia, October/November 2026

== Publications ==
The Society jointly publishes a peer-reviewed technical journal, Precision Engineering: Journal of the International Societies for Precision Engineering and Nanotechnology, in cooperation with its European and Japanese counterparts.

== Lifetime achievement award ==
The American Society for Precision Engineering presents the ASPE Lifetime Achievement Award to individuals who have made significant contributions to the field of Precision Engineering.
