= Kinematic determinacy =

Kinematic determinacy is a term used in structural mechanics to describe a structure where material compatibility conditions alone can be used to calculate deflections. A kinematically determinate structure can be defined as a structure where, if it is possible to find nodal displacements compatible with member extensions, those nodal displacements are unique. The structure has no possible mechanisms, i.e. nodal displacements, compatible with zero member extensions, at least to a first-order approximation. Mathematically, the mass matrix of the structure must have full rank. Kinematic determinacy can be loosely used to classify an arrangement of structural members as a structure (stable) instead of a mechanism (unstable). The principles of kinematic determinacy are used to design precision devices such as mirror mounts for optics, and precision linear motion bearings.

== See also ==
- Statical determinacy
- Precision engineering
- Kinematic coupling
