= Precision engineering =

Field of engineering dealing with extremely low tolerances

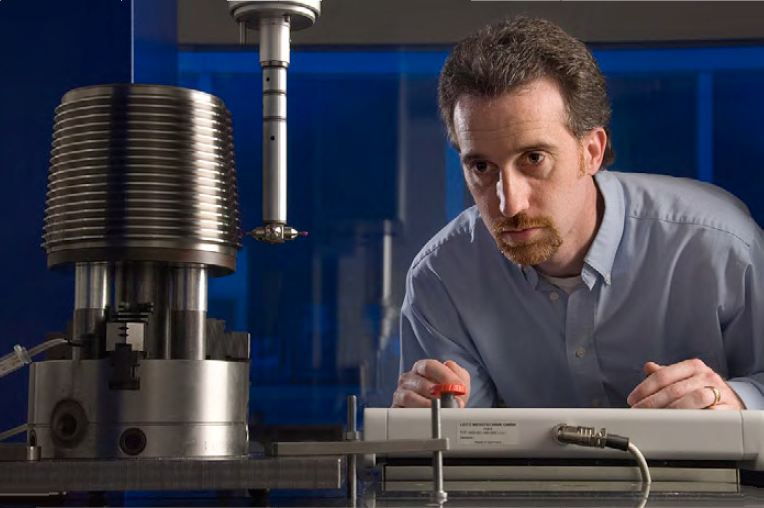
NIST Precision engineering research. Measurement of API Rotary Master Gauge on CMM.

Precision engineering is a subdiscipline of electrical engineering, software engineering, electronics engineering, mechanical engineering, and optical engineering concerned with designing machines, fixtures, and other structures that have exceptionally low tolerances, are repeatable, and are stable over time. These approaches have applications in machine tools, MEMS, NEMS, optoelectronics design, and many other fields.

Precision engineering is a branch of engineering that focuses on the design, development and manufacture of product with high levels of accuracy and repeatability.

It involves the use of advanced technologies and techniques to achieve tight tolerance and dimensional control in the manufacturing process.

== Overview ==
Professors Hiromu Nakazawa and Pat McKeown provide the following list of goals for precision engineering:

1. Create a highly precise movement.
2. Reduce the dispersion of the product's or part's function.
3. Eliminate fitting and promote assembly, especially automatic assembly.
4. Reduce the initial cost.
5. Reduce the running cost.
6. Extend the life span.
7. Enable the design safety factor to be lowered.
8. Improve interchangeability of components so that corresponding parts made by other factories or firms can be used in their place.
9. Improve quality control through higher machine accuracy capabilities and hence reduce scrap, rework, and conventional inspection.
10. Achieve a greater wear/fatigue life of components.
11. Make functions independent of one another.
12. Achieve greater miniaturization and packing densities.
13. Achieve further advances in technology and the underlying sciences.

== Technical Societies ==
- American Society for Precision Engineering
- euspen - European Society for Precision Engineering and Nanotechnology
- JSPE- The Japan Society for Precision Engineering
- DSPE - Dutch Society for Precision Engineering
- SPETA - Singapore Precision Engineering and Technology Association

== See also ==
- Abbe error
- Accuracy and precision
- Flexures
- Kinematic coupling
- Measurement uncertainty
- Kinematic determinacy
