= Linda Schmidt =

American mechanical engineer

Linda Catherine Schmidt (November 27, 1958 – March 12, 2021) was an American mechanical engineer whose interests included the engineering design process, the use of formal grammars in design, and engineering education. She was a faculty member in the A. James Clark School of Engineering at the University of Maryland, College Park.

== Life ==
Schmidt was born on November 27, 1958, in Blue Island, Illinois. She studied industrial engineering at Iowa State University, earning a bachelor's degree in 1989 and a master's degree in 1991. Her master's degree research concerned queueing theory, under the mentorship of John Jackman. She next went to Carnegie Mellon University for doctoral study in mechanical engineering, completing her Ph.D. in 1995. Her dissertation, An Implementation Using Grammars of an Abstraction-Based Model of Mechanical Design for Design Optimization and Design Space Characterization, was supervised by Jonathan Cagan.

She joined the University of Maryland as an assistant professor of mechanical engineering in 1995, and was tenured as an associate professor there in 2001. At the University of Maryland, she founded and directed the Designer Assistance Tool Laboratory, and the DesignME Suite, a group of three student engineering design laboratories.

She died on March 12, 2021.

== Recognition ==
Schmidt was the 2008 winner of the Fred Merryfield Design Award of the American Society for Engineering Education. She was named as an ASME Fellow by the American Society of Mechanical Engineers in 2014, "for her influential role in the development of the field of engineering design and her lasting contributions to these fields".

== Books ==
Schmidt was the author or coauthor of books including:

- Product Engineering and Manufacturing (with Cunniff, Daily, Dieter, Hermann, Zhang, and Cunniff, College House, 1998; 2nd ed., 2002)
- Engineering Design (with George E. Dieter, McGraw Hill, 4th ed., 2009)

She was coeditor of:

- Decision Making in Engineering Design (with Chen and Lewis, ASME Press, 2006)
