= Differential screw =

Adjustment mechanism

Rotating a bolt through two nuts with slightly different thread pitches for each changes the separation of the nuts by the difference between the threads.

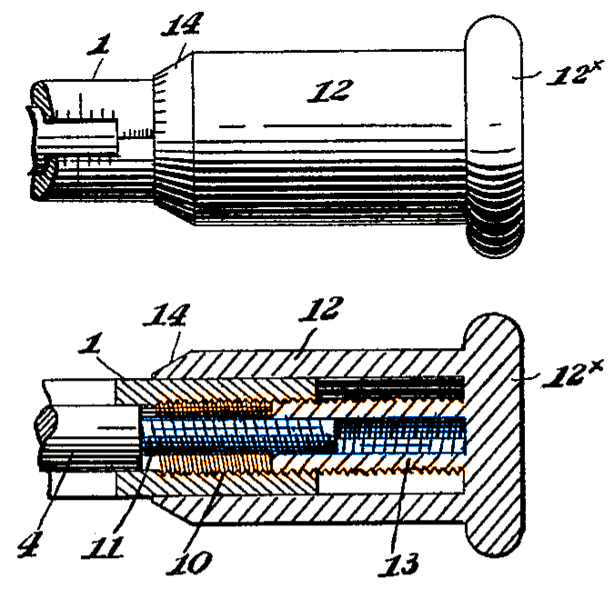
Micrometer adjuster with differential threads. The threads 11 on rod 4 have one pitch (e.g. 25 tpi, blue), while the threads 10 in the barrel 1 have another (e.g. 20 tpi, orange). A full turn of the thimble 12 rotates the nut sleeve 13 and its two threads (20 tpi outside and 25 tpi inside) to move the rod ^{1}/_{20} - ^{1}/_{25} = 0.01 in (0.25 mm) relative to the barrel.

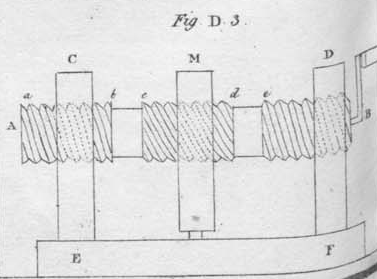
Differential screw illustration from an 1817 machine design handbook. ab & ef have one thread pitch while cd has a different one. One turn of AB moves the whole spindle one ab thread distance; simultaneously, M moves one cd thread distance and the amount that AB moved. M's overall movement is thus the difference between ab and cd.

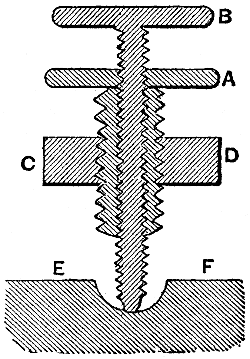
Differential screw leveling feet, drawing by Joshua Rose, 1887.

A differential screw is a mechanism used for making small, precise adjustments to the spacing between two objects (such as in focusing a microscope, moving the anvils of a micrometer, or positioning optics). A differential screw uses a spindle with two screw threads of differing leads (in case of a single lead equal to the thread pitch), and possibly opposite handedness, on which two nuts move. As the spindle rotates, the space between the nuts changes based on the difference between the threads. These mechanisms allow extremely small adjustments using commonly available screws. A differential screw mechanism using two nuts incurs higher friction and therefore requires more torque to turn than a simple, single lead screw with an equivalent pitch.

== History ==
The first known use of a differential screw was on Towneley’s version of Gascoigne’s Micrometer.

Flamsteed’s Preface to the Historia Coelestis Britannica:

"Richard Towneley ... carried forward and completed his instrument (the micrometer) and made it perform with one screw, what on Gascoigne’s instrument had required two.”

A drawing by Robert Hooke in 1667 clearly shows Towneley’s Micrometer with the single screw with two different pitch threads on it. With this differential screw, one thread was half the pitch of the other, Towneley was able to keep the micrometer's indicating pointers centered in the field of view as they opened and closed.

== Examples ==
Many differential screw configurations are possible. The micrometer adjuster pictured uses a nut sleeve with different inner and outer thread pitches to connect a screw on the adjusting rod end with threads inside the main barrel; as the thimble rotates the nut sleeve, the rod and barrel move relative to each other based on the differential between the threads.

Another arrangement holds the two "nuts" co-axially in a single fixture and has two separate screws with slightly different pitches (distance from the crest of one thread to the next) entering from opposite ends. The "heads" of the screws are fixed to the two objects whose spacing is to be adjusted. Each rotation of the fixture holding the nuts moves one screw into its nut by a small amount and moves the other screw out of its nut by a slightly larger amount. The total spacing between the screws, and thus the objects, will be slightly changed based on the difference in travel between the two screws.

More arrangements are possible. Two nuts can be fixed to each of two objects to be adjusted and the two screw heads attached to each other in the middle. The combined screws would be turned to adjust the spacing in that case.

== Calculating motion and effective thread pitch ==
For single start threads, each turn changes the distance between the nuts by the effective pitch, P_{eff}. For a bolt with a given thread per inch, TPI_{1} on one end and a second thread per inch, TPI_{2} on the other, the change in distance (or P_{eff}), and the effective thread per inch TPI_{eff} , is calculated by:

1/TPI_{1} - 1/TPI_{2} = 1/TPI_{eff} = P_{eff}

For example, a bolt with coarse threads (16 tpi, 0.0625 in [1.59 mm] per turn) on one end and fine threads (24 tpi, 0.0416 in [1.06 mm] per turn) on the other changes the distance between the nuts by about 0.02 inches (0.51 mm) per revolution and is equivalent to a 48 tpi (0.53 mm/thread) thread:

1/16 - 1/24 = 0.0208 in. (48 tpi, 0.53 mm/thread)

For single start Metric threads, the effective pitch is simply the difference between the two thread pitches:

Pitch_{1} - Pitch_{2} = Pitch_{eff}

For example, an M5×0.80 thread paired with an M4×0.70 thread will produce a differential motion of 0.1 mm, or 100 μm per revolution.

Mixing metric and imperial threads can result in finer differentials while still using standard threads, they can be calculated in the same way as a metric differential but the TPI of the imperial thread must be converted to a metric pitch measurement. For example a 26 TPI thread has a pitch of ~0.977 mm and when paired with a 1.0 mm pitch metric thread the differential motion will be approximately 0.023 mm per revolution.
