= Kinematic coupling =

Fixture which constrains all degrees of freedom of a part

Kinematic coupling describes fixtures designed to exactly constrain the part in question, providing precision and certainty of location. A canonical example of a kinematic coupling consists of three radial v-grooves in one part that mate with three hemispheres in another part. Each hemisphere has two contact points for a total of six contact points, enough to constrain all six of the part's degrees of freedom. An alternative design consists of three hemispheres on one part that fit respectively into a tetrahedral dent, a v-groove, and a flat.

== Background ==
Kinematic couplings arose from the need of precision coupling between structural interfaces that were meant to be routinely taken apart and put back together.

=== Kelvin Coupling ===
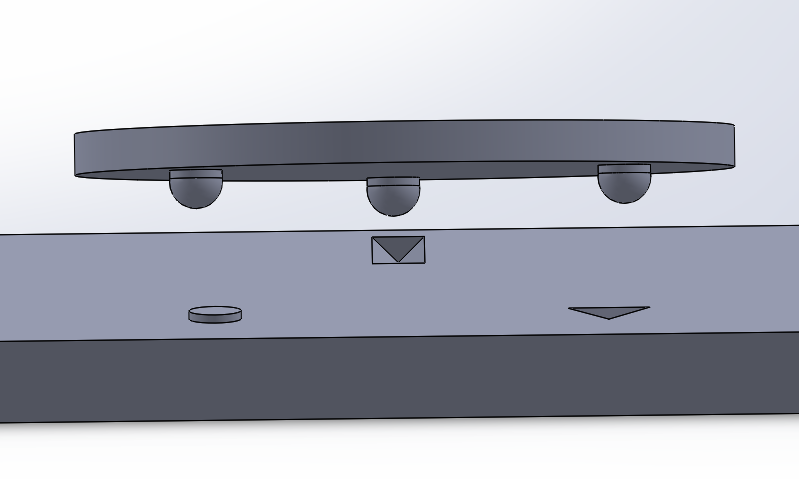
Kelvin kinematic coupling

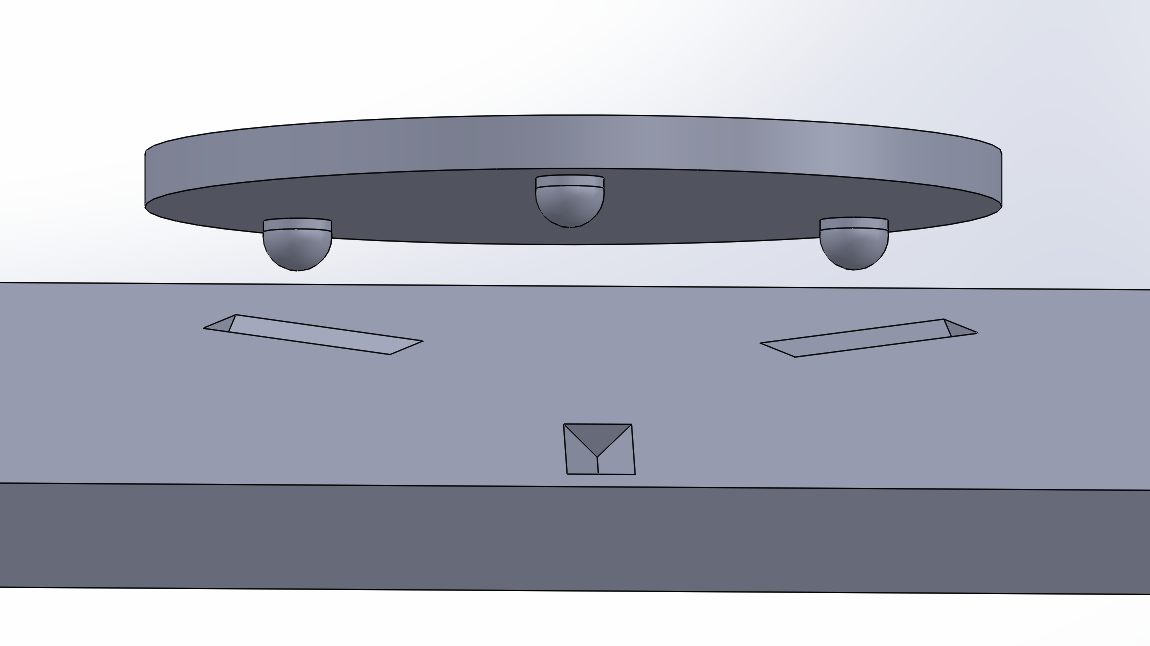
Maxwell kinematic coupling

The Kelvin coupling is named after William Thompson (Lord Kelvin) who published the design in 1868–71. It consists of three spherical surfaces that rest respectively on the following three shaped holes: a concave tetrahedron, a V-groove (V-shaped valley) pointing towards the tetrahedron, and a flat plate. The tetrahedron provides three contact points, the V-groove provides two, and the flat provides one, so the total six contact points, constrain the movement of the object having the three spherical surfaces. The benefit of this design is that the center of rotation is located at the tetrahedron, however, it suffers from contact stress problems in high-load applications.

=== Maxwell coupling ===
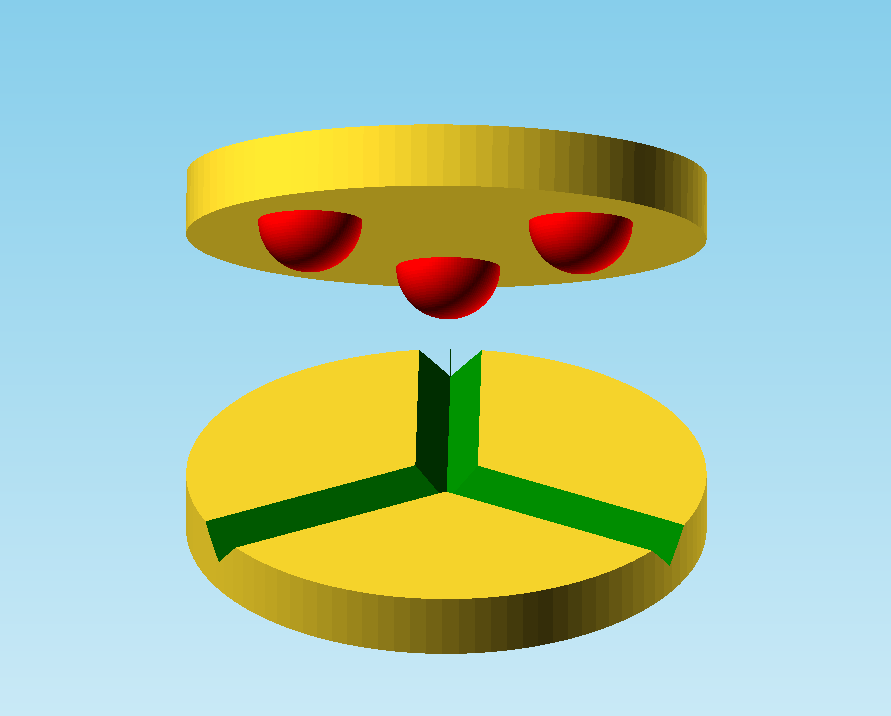
Example of a Maxwell kinematic coupling

The principles of this coupling system were originally published by James Clerk Maxwell in 1871. The Maxwell Kinematic system consists of three V-shaped grooves that are oriented to the center of the part, while the mating part has three curved surfaces that sit down into the three grooves. Each of the three v-grooves provides two contact points for a total of six. This design benefits from symmetry and therefore easier manufacturing techniques. Also, the Maxwell coupling is thermally stable due to this symmetry as the curved surfaces can expand or contract in unison in the v-grooves.

== Theory ==
The reproducibility and the precision of a kinematic coupling come from the idea of exact constraint design. The principle of exact constraint design is that the number of points of constraint should be equal to the number of degrees of freedom to be constrained. In a mechanical system there are six potential degrees of freedom. There are three linear degrees of freedom (also known as translation) along the "x", "y", and "z" axis, and three rotational degrees of freedom around each axis commonly called roll, pitch and yaw. If a system is under-constrained, then parts are free to move with respect to each other. If the system is over-constrained, it may undesirably deform under the influences of, for example, thermal expansion. Kinematic coupling designs only make contact with the number of points equal to the number of degrees of freedom that are to be restrained and therefore are predictable.

== See also ==
- Kinematics
- Kinematic determinacy
- Precision engineering
