= 2012 Republican Party presidential candidates =

- August 28, 2012 (Republican National Convention)
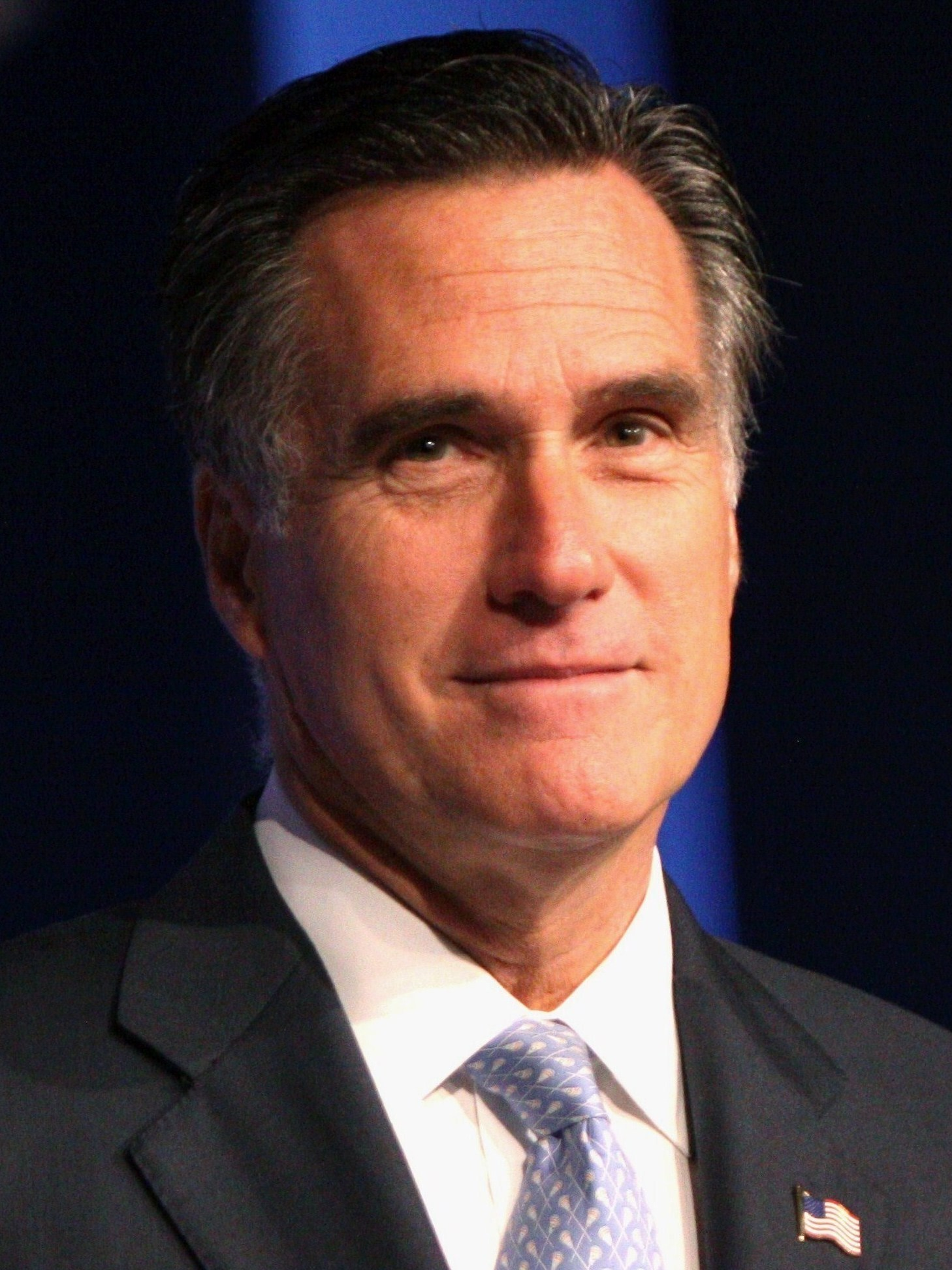

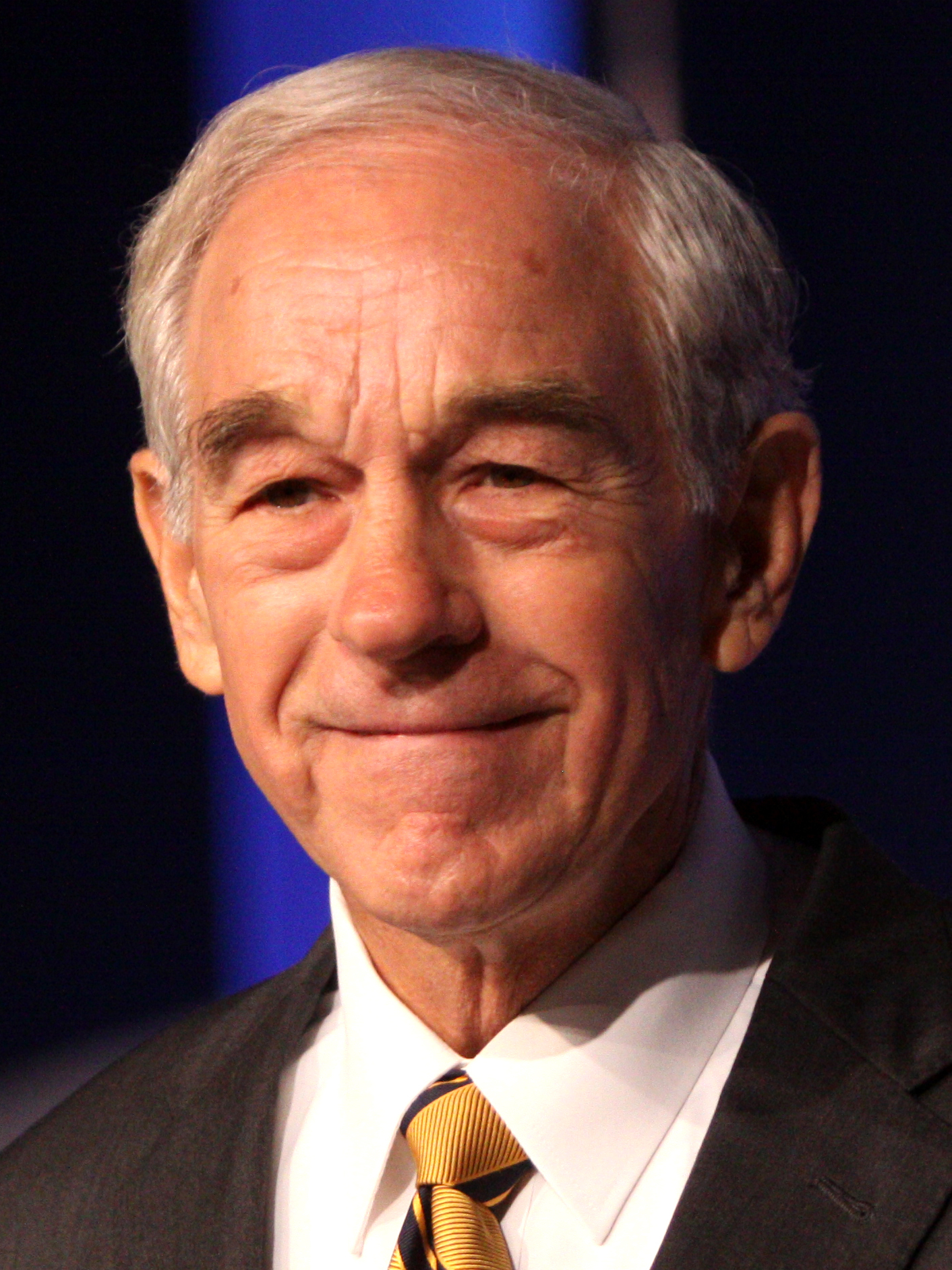
Candidate	Mitt Romney	Ron Paul
Home state	Massachusetts	Texas
Delegate count	2061	190
States carried	42+ DC & U.S. Territories	3
Popular vote	10,031,336	2,095,762
Percentage	52.13%	10.89%
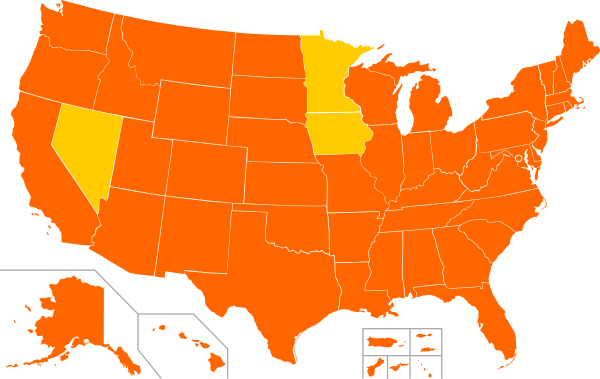
- First place finishes by convention roll call
Previous Republican nominee before election
John McCain
Republican nominee
Mitt Romney

This article contains lists of notable candidates for the United States Republican Party's 2012 presidential nomination.

== Candidates ==
The following individuals filed with the Federal Election Commission (FEC) and/or announced their intentions to seek the 2012 presidential nomination of the Republican Party. In this table, those marked lighter grey were not featured in any televised debates that occurred while their respective campaigns were active; those marked darker grey were excluded from the majority of those same televised debates, but are notable for having debated with at least some of the televised candidates in other forums (usually online). Candidates with an asterisk after their withdrawal date subsequently sought the nomination of another party.

See results of the 2012 Republican Party presidential primaries for more details about the outcome of the primaries.

=== Nominee ===
Candidate	Background	Declared	States/popular vote/delegates won	Withdrew	Notes
Mitt Romney (campaign)	Former governor of Massachusetts	June 2, 2011	42; 9,947,433 (52.13%); 2,061	N/A	The withdrawal of candidate Rick Santorum on April 10, 2012, eliminated his main challenger and all but guaranteed him the nomination. Newt Gingrich's exit from the race on May 2 left him against Ron Paul and Fred Karger. His win in Texas on May 29 finally accumulated enough delegates to mathematically secure him the nomination. Romney was officially announced as the 2012 Republican presidential nominee on August 28, 2012. He was defeated by incumbent President Barack Obama in the general election on November 6, 2012.

=== Did not withdraw ===
Candidate	Background	Declared	States/popular vote/delegates won	Withdrew	Notes
Ron Paul (campaign)	U.S. Representative from Texas	May 13, 2011	1; 2,017,957 (10.89%); 190	N/A	Leading up to the convention, Ron Paul won bound pluralities of the official delegations from the states of Iowa, Louisiana, Maine, Minnesota, Nevada, and Oregon (but not the Virgin Islands, despite winning the popular vote there). Due to disputes these were reduced to Iowa, Minnesota, and Nevada; however, he additionally had nomination-from-the-floor-pluralities in the states of Oregon and Alaska, plus the Virgin Islands. Although he wasn't named the 2012 Republican nominee, he did not officially end his campaign or endorse nominee Mitt Romney for president. At the convention, Ron Paul received second place with 8% of the delegates.

=== Withdrew after the primaries ===
Candidate	Background	Declared	States/popular vote/delegates won	Withdrew	Notes
Fred Karger	Political consultant and gay rights activist of California	March 23, 2011	0; 10,831 (0.07%); 0	June 29, 2012	Karger was not invited to any of the televised debates, but participated in the December WePolls.com online debate along with Gary Johnson and Buddy Roemer. He came in 4th place with 1,893 votes in Puerto Rico, 1,180 votes in Michigan, 10 votes in Iowa, 345 votes in New Hampshire, 377 votes in Maryland, 6,481 votes in his home state of California, and 545 votes in Utah, amounting up to a total of 10,831 votes. He withdrew following a 5th-place finish in the Utah primary, which was the final primary of the 2012 cycle. Karger received no delegate votes at the convention.

=== Appeared on more than two primary ballots ===
Candidate	Background	Declared	States/popular vote/delegates won	Withdrew	Notes
Newt Gingrich (campaign)	Former U.S. Speaker of the House of Representatives from Georgia	May 11, 2011	2; 2,689,771 (14.20%); 0	May 2, 2012	After a poor showing in the Delaware primaries, Gingrich's advisers hinted on April 25, 2012, that he would exit the race the following week. He officially ended his campaign on May 2, and endorsed Mitt Romney. Gingrich received no delegate votes at the convention, having released his bound delegates to Romney.
Rick Santorum (campaign)	Former U.S. senator from Pennsylvania	June 6, 2011	11; 3,816,110 (20.43%); 9	April 10, 2012	Santorum suspended his campaign following the hospitalization of his three-year-old daughter Isabella, as well as a strong showing by front runner Mitt Romney in primaries and polls. He conceded the race to Romney later that day, though didn't fully endorse him until May 7. Santorum received nine delegate votes at the convention, coming in third behind Romney and Ron Paul, despite having officially released his bound delegates to Romney.
Buddy Roemer (campaign)	Former governor of Louisiana	June 21, 2011	0; 33,212 (0.17%); 1	February 22, 2012*	Roemer was not invited to any of the televised debates, but participated in the November LibertyPAC online debate with Gingrich, Johnson, and Santorum, and then also in the December WePolls.com online debate along with Gary Johnson and Fred Karger. He received a total of 30,523 votes from Iowa New Hampshire, Tennessee, Michigan, Georgia, Louisiana, Texas, California, and Puerto Rico, where he came in third place. On February 22, he withdrew from the Republican race to pursue nomination as a member of the Reform Party. Roemer received one delegate-vote at the convention.
Rick Perry (campaign)	Governor of Texas	August 13, 2011	0; 42,251 (0.28%); 0	January 19, 2012	After doing poorly in Iowa and New Hampshire, he suspended his campaign, endorsing Newt Gingrich. On April 25, he switched his endorsement to Mitt Romney, after advisers hinted that Gingrich would withdraw from the race. He remained on the ballot in most states prior to Super Tuesday, and received 54,769 votes during the primary season. Perry received no delegate votes at the convention.
Jon Huntsman Jr. (campaign)	Former Governor of Utah and US Ambassador to China	June 21, 2011	0; 83,173 (0.44%); 1	January 16, 2012	After coming in third in New Hampshire, he suspended his campaign, endorsing Mitt Romney. He remained on the ballot in most states prior to Super Tuesday, and received 84,724 votes during the primary season, collecting two delegates. Huntsman received one delegate vote at the convention.
Michele Bachmann (campaign)	U.S. Representative from Minnesota	June 27, 2011	0; 41,401 (0.21%); 1	January 4, 2012 (running for re-election)	After winning the Ames Straw Poll, her candidacy collapsed and after coming sixth in the Iowa caucuses, she suspended her presidential campaign. After months of speculation, Bachmann endorsed Mitt Romney on May 3. She remained on the ballot in most states prior to Super Tuesday, and received 41,401 votes during the primary season, collecting two 'soft' delegates. Bachmann received one delegate vote at the convention.

=== Suspended or withdrew before the primaries, but appeared on at least three primary ballots ===
Candidate	Background	Declared	States/popular vote/delegates won	Withdrew	Notes
Herman Cain (campaign)	Businessman of Georgia	May 21, 2011	0; 13,629 (0.07%); 0	December 3, 2011	After a series of scandals, Cain suspended his presidential campaign, and after momentarily reviving it as part of Stephen Colbert's satirical presidential campaign, endorsed Newt Gingrich on January 28, 2012. On April 17, 2012, he changed his endorsement to Mitt Romney. He remained on the ballot in a number of states, and has received 13,629 votes during the primary season. Cain received no delegate votes at the convention.
Gary Johnson (Campaign)	Former Governor of New Mexico	April 21, 2011	0; 4,364 (0.02%); 0	December 28, 2011*	Johnson was in the first televised debate, and in one other televised debate, but was excluded from the other televised debates. He debated online during November with Gingrich, Santorum, and Roemer; he then debated online with Roemer and Karger during December. Johnson withdrew his candidacy for the Republican presidential nomination on December 28, endorsing Ron Paul in that contest. Johnson officially declared his candidacy for the 2012 Libertarian Party presidential nomination on the same day, and became the party's nominee on May 5, 2012. He remained on the Republican primary ballot in a number of states and received 4,364 votes during the Republican primary season. As the Libertarian nominee, Johnson received 1,274,136 votes (which was 1% of the votes cast) on the November general election ballot.

=== Appeared on only two primary ballots ===
L. John Davis Jr.	L. John Davis Jr., small business owner from Colorado, filed with the FEC on October 1, 2010. He participated in the lesser-known candidates forum ahead of the New Hampshire Primary. Davis appeared on the ballot in New Hampshire and Texas, receiving 3,901 votes in total.
Michael J. Meehan	Michael J. Meehan, realtor from Missouri, participated in the lesser-known candidates forum ahead of the New Hampshire primary. He appeared on the ballot in New Hampshire and Missouri, receiving 410 votes in total.
Mark Callahan	Mark Callahan, technician from Oregon, filed with the FEC on May 16, 2011. He appeared on the ballot in New Hampshire and Arizona, receiving 378 votes in total.
Christopher Hill	Christopher Hill, airline pilot from Kentucky, filed with the FEC on May 31, 2011. He participated in the lesser-known candidates forum ahead of the New Hampshire primary. Hill appeared on the ballot in New Hampshire and Arizona, receiving 247 votes in total.
Randy Crow	Randy Crow, business owner and conspiracy theorist from North Carolina, originally filed with the FEC to run as an Independent on May 11, 2010. He switched his affiliation to Republican on November 12, 2010. Crow participated in the lesser-known candidates forum in December 2011, ahead of the New Hampshire primary. He appeared on the ballot in New Hampshire and Louisiana, receiving 198 votes in total.
Keith Drummond	Keith Drummond, a businessman from Texas, filed with the FEC on September 12, 2011. He appeared on the ballot in New Hampshire and Missouri, receiving 195 votes.

=== Appeared on only one primary ballot ===
Andy Martin	Andy Martin, perennial candidate and birther activist of Illinois, declared his candidacy on December 29, 2010. He received 19 votes in New Hampshire and did not attempt to get his name on any other ballot. On April 25, 2012, Martin dropped his bid for the nomination and announced his intent to remain politically active within the race until the 2012 Republican national convention, at which point he endorsed nominee Mitt Romney.
Stewart Greenleaf	Stewart Greenleaf, Pennsylvania State Senator, signed up for the New Hampshire primary ballot on October 28, 2011. He received 24 votes there and did not attempt to get his name on any other ballot.

- Sarah Gonzalez (AZ)
- Paul Sims (AZ)
- Al Perry (AZ)
- Cesar Cisneros (AZ)
- Kevin Rubash (NH)
- Donald Benjamin (AZ)
- Michael Levinson (AZ)
- Kip Dean (AZ)
- Ronald Zack (AZ)
- Jeff Lawman (NH)
- Frank Lynch (AZ)
- Wayne Arnett (AZ)
- Raymond Perkins (AZ)
- Matt Welch (AZ)
- Benjamin Linn (NH)
- Jim Terr (AZ)
- Charles Skelley (AZ)
- Simon Bollander (AZ)
- Joe Story (NH)
- Bear Betzler (NH)
- Joe Robinson (NH)
- Linden Swift (NH)
- Timothy Brewer (NH)
- Vern Wuensche (NH)
- Hugh Cort (NH)
- James Vestermark (NH)

=== Filed with the FEC, but appeared on no primary ballots ===
Jimmy McMillan	Jimmy McMillan, perennial candidate from New York declared his candidacy on December 23, 2010. He stopped running as a Republican candidate on January 31, 2012, in an attempt to get his Rent Is Too Damn High Party on the New York ballot in November via lawsuit. On September 13, 2012, McMillan dropped out of the race in order to focus on his candidacy for the 2013 New York City mayoral election, and endorsed President Barack Obama.
Thaddeus McCotter	Main article: Thaddeus McCotter 2012 presidential campaign Thaddeus McCotter, U.S. Representative from Michigan, declared his candidacy on July 2, 2011. McCotter was in the July 20 TheTeaParty.net twitter-debate, along with Bachmann, Cain, Gingrich, Johnson, and Santorum, but was not invited to the two Iowa & California televised debates which occurred while he was running. McCotter dropped out of the race on September 22, 2011 (the day of the televised Florida debate—the third during his campaign—to which he also was not invited), and endorsed Mitt Romney. He received 35 votes at the Ames Straw Poll.
Tim Pawlenty	Main article: Tim Pawlenty 2012 presidential campaign Tim Pawlenty, former governor of Minnesota, declared his candidacy on May 23, 2011. Pawlenty dropped out of the race on August 14, 2011, after a third-place finish at the Ames Straw Poll. He endorsed Mitt Romney for President on September 12, 2011. He received 2,293 votes, or 13.6%, at Ames, and two write-ins in the Caucus itself, as well as four in New Hampshire, for a total of six during the primary season.
Jonathon Sharkey	Jonathon Sharkey, perennial candidate from Florida, filed a presidential committee with the FEC on May 5, 2010. Sharkey withdrew from the race on August 17, 2011, to pursue a movie career.
Jack Fellure	Jack Fellure, perennial candidate from West Virginia, filed a presidential committee with the FEC on November 5, 2008. Fellure ended his campaign for the Republican nomination on June 22, 2011, after receiving the presidential nomination of the Prohibition Party.

=== Formed exploratory committee but did not run ===
Roy Moore	Roy Moore, former Chief Justice of the Alabama Supreme Court, announced the formation of an exploratory committee on May 18, 2011. When that campaign failed to gain traction, he began to draw speculation in the media as being a potential Constitution Party presidential contender. Moore eventually withdrew his exploratory committee and ended all speculation of a presidential candidacy in November 2011, when he announced he would seek election to his former post of Chief Justice of the Alabama Supreme Court in 2012. He received two write-in votes in Iowa.
David Duke	David Duke, former Member of the Louisiana House of Representatives.

== Speculative candidates ==
=== Received speculation ===
The following people were the object of presidential speculation in media reports in 2011. This gallery does not include people who declined to run (see below).

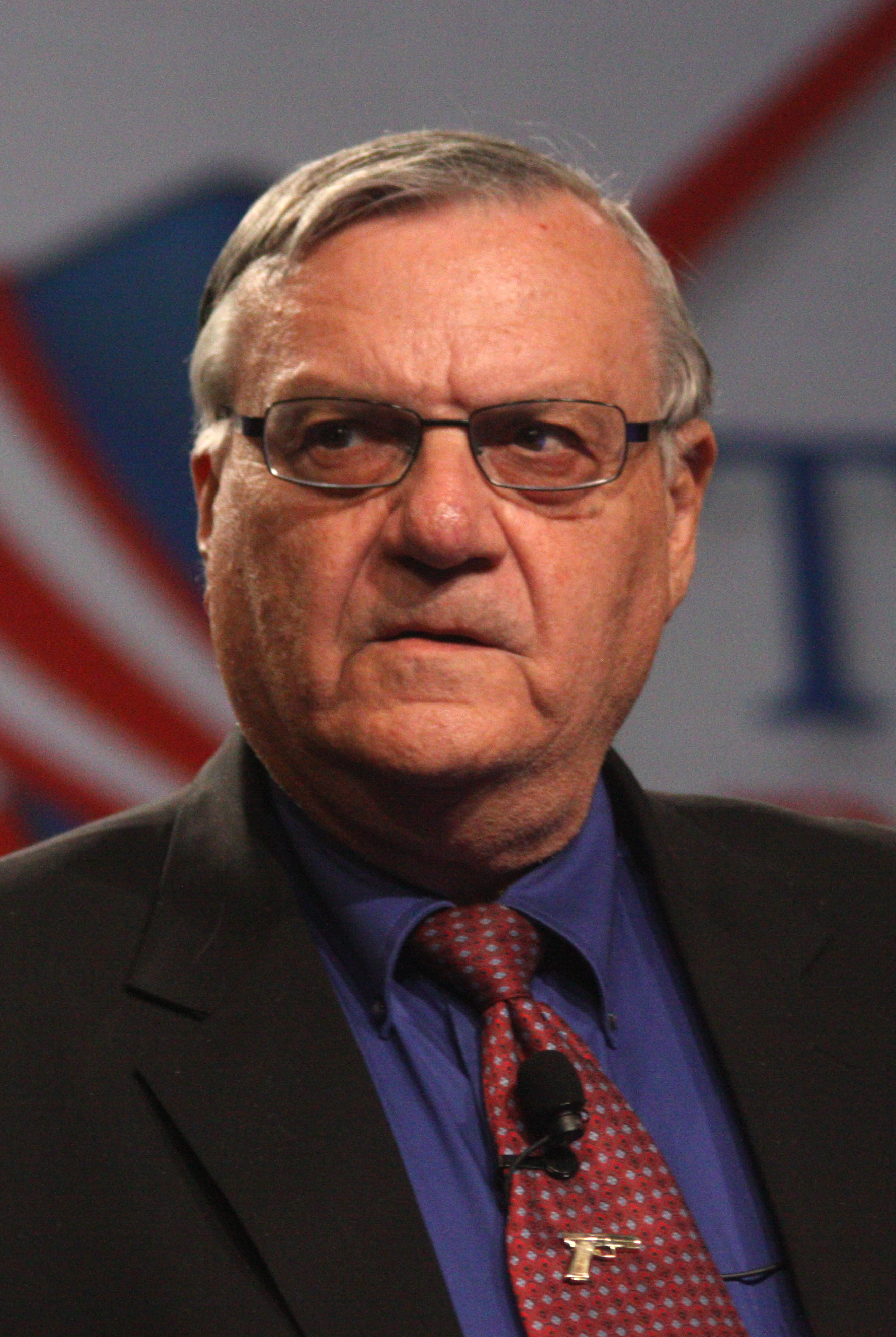
Joe Arpaio
Sheriff of Maricopa County, Arizona
Endorsed Rick Perry

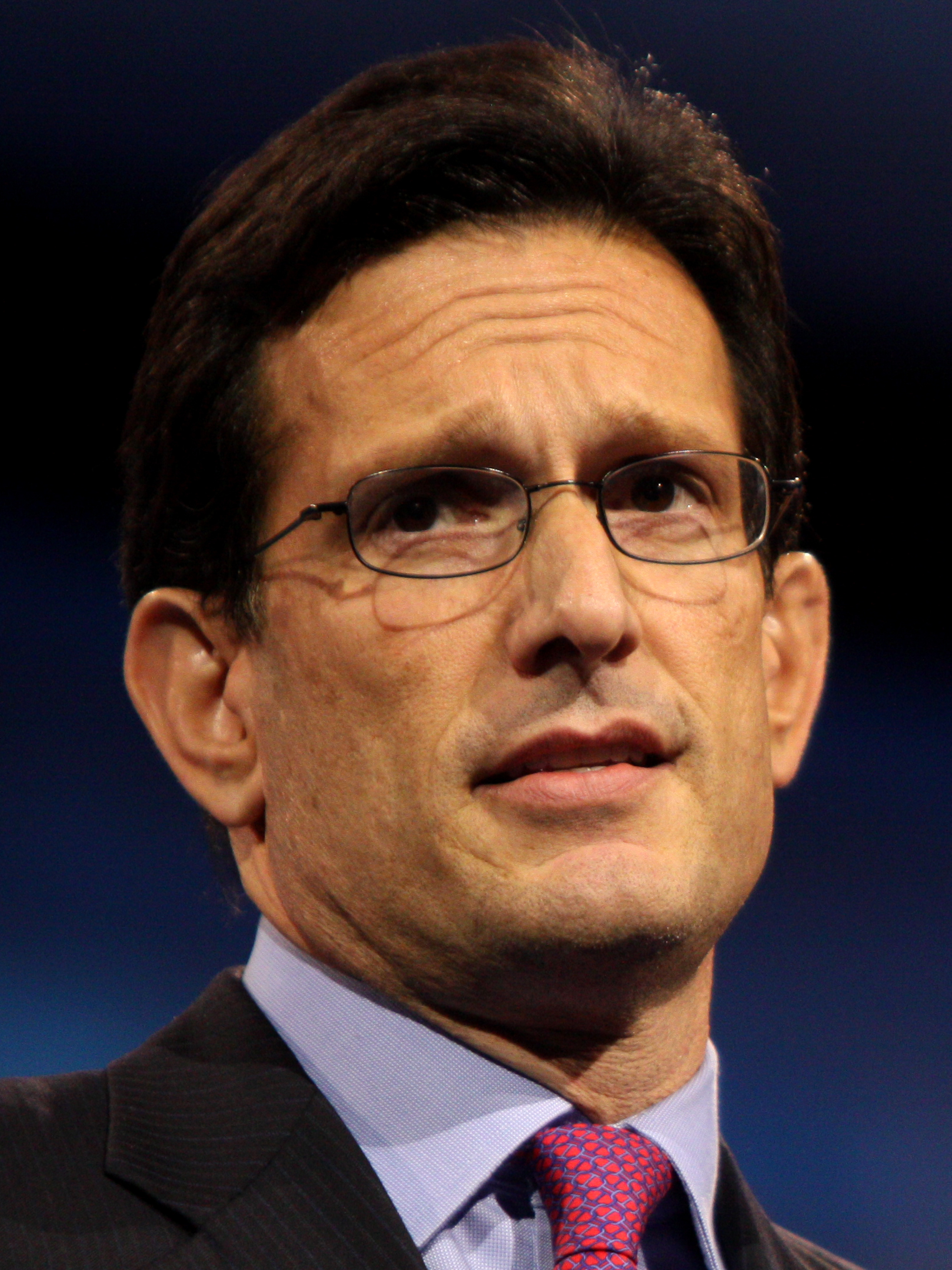
Eric Cantor (from Virginia)
Majority Leader of the U.S. House of Representatives
Endorsed Mitt Romney

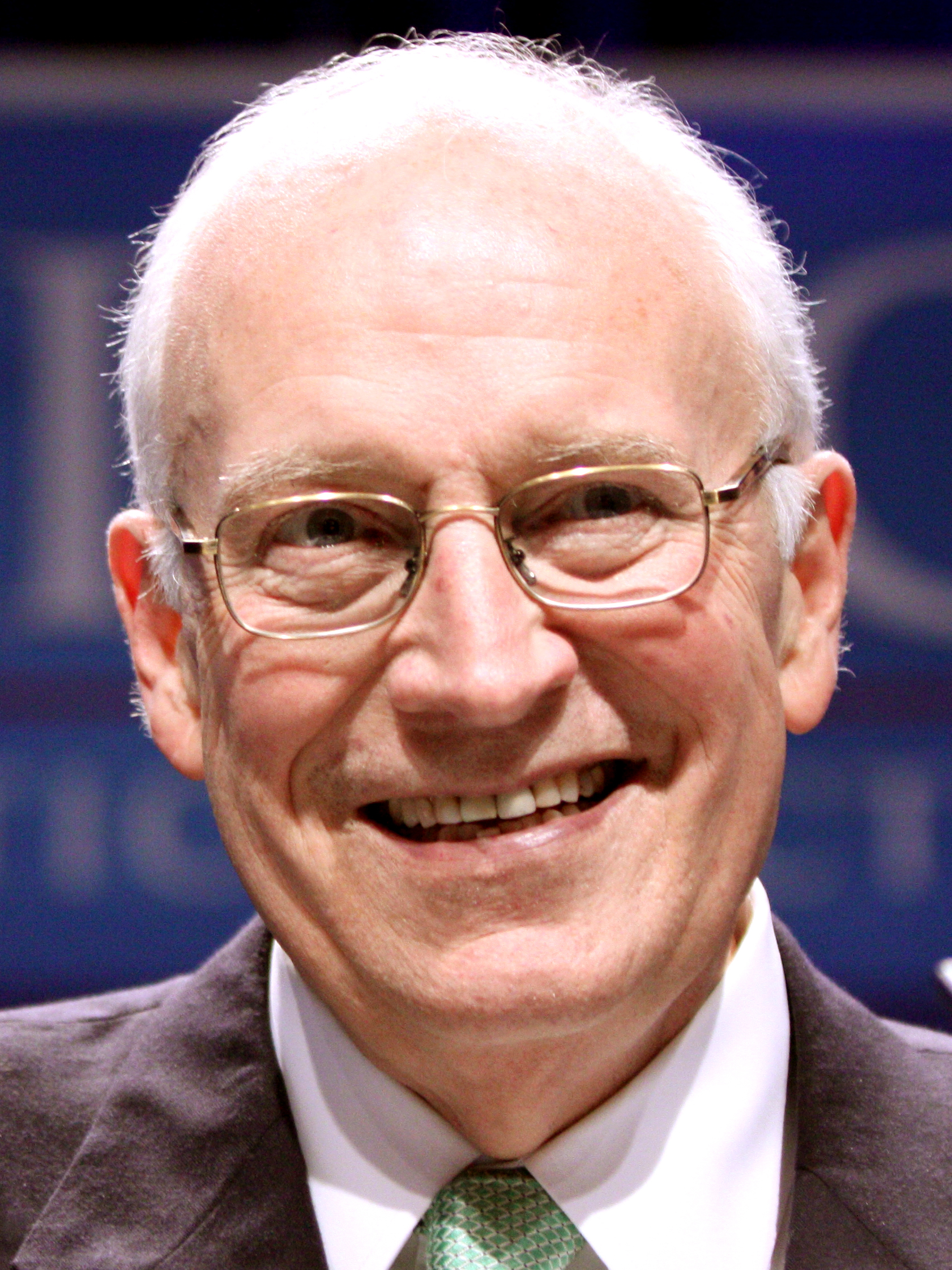
Dick Cheney (from Wyoming)
Former U.S. Vice President
Endorsed Mitt Romney

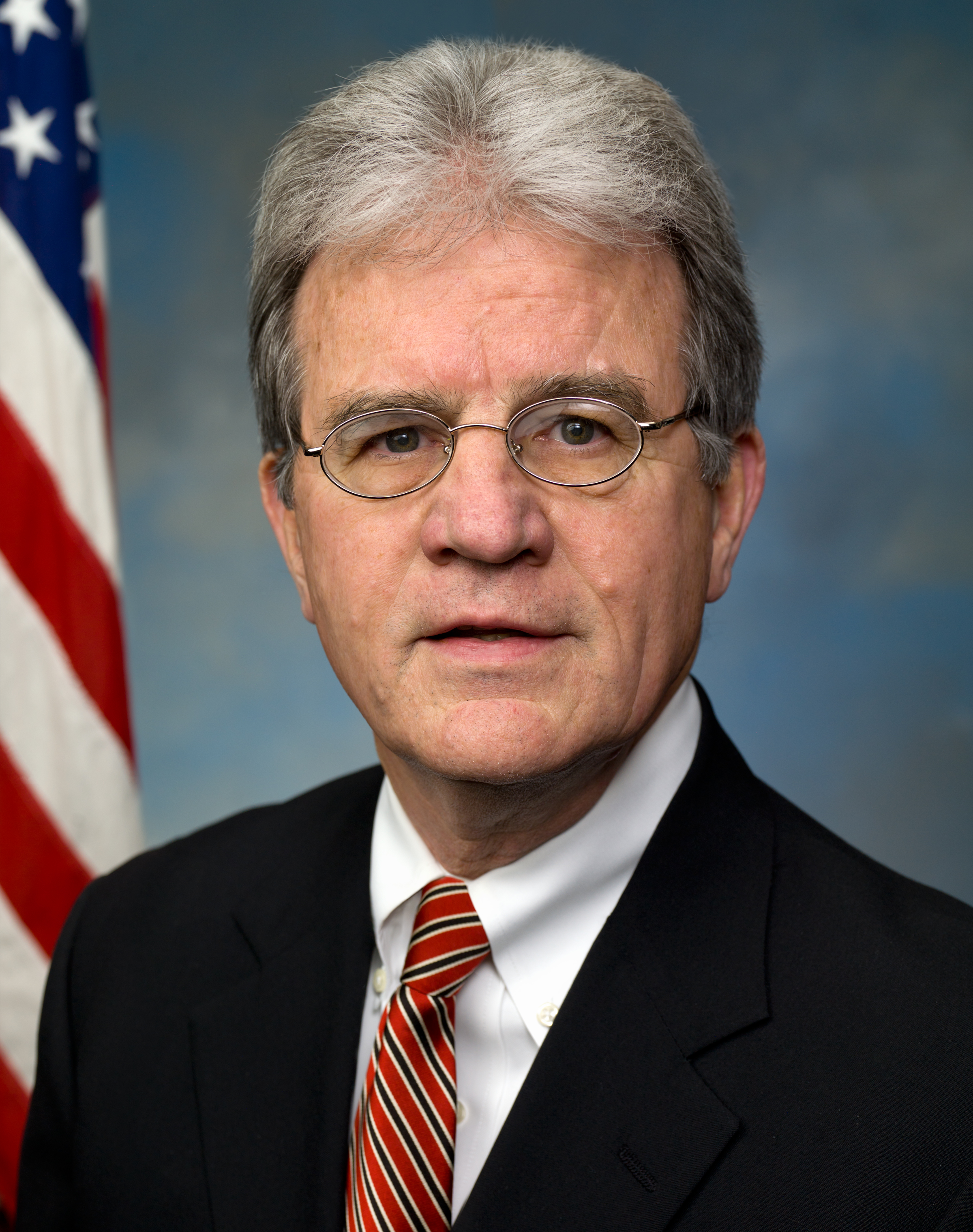
Tom Coburn
U.S. Senator for Oklahoma
Endorsed Mitt Romney

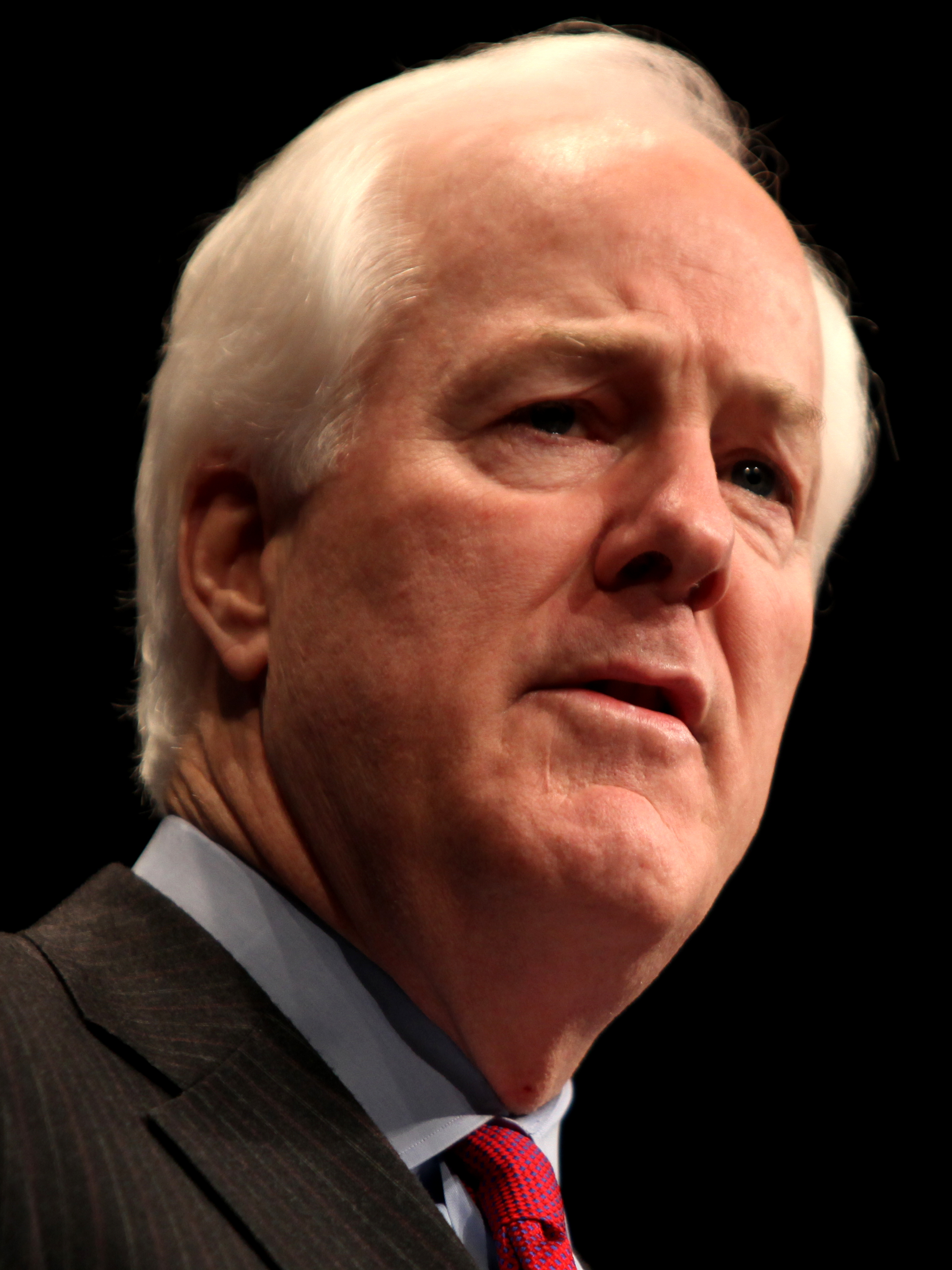
John Cornyn
U.S. Senator for Texas

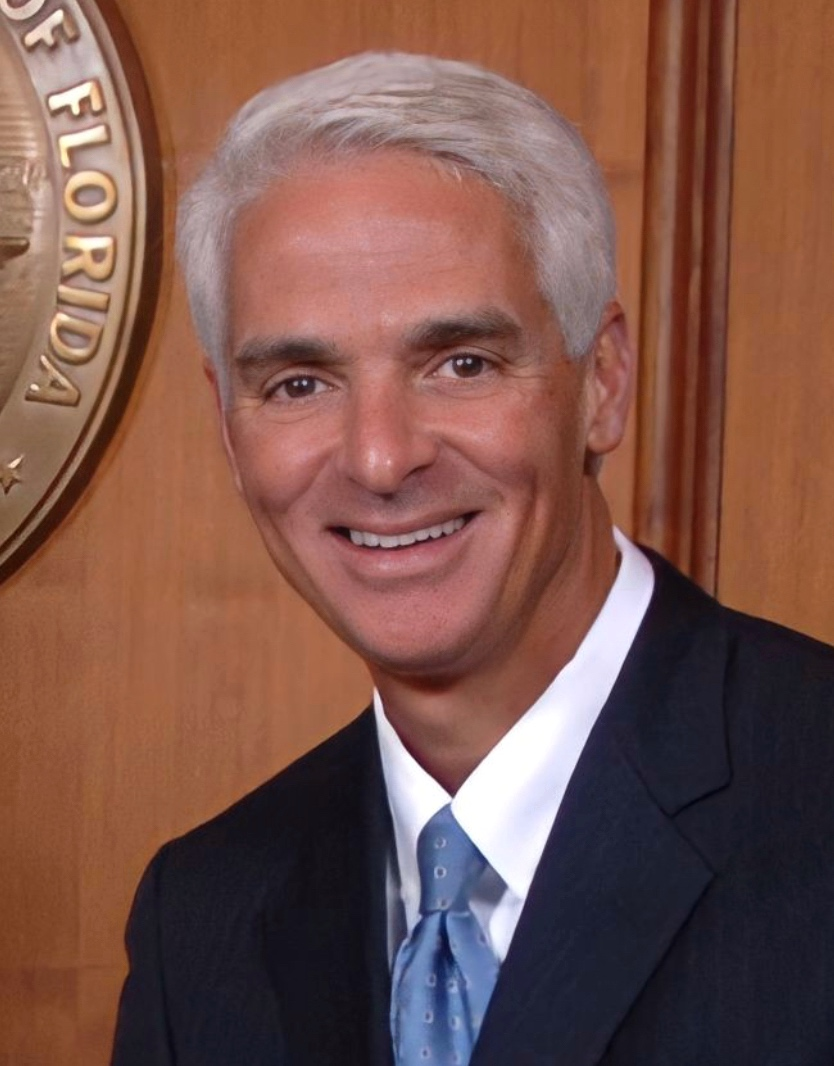
Charlie Crist
Former Governor of Florida

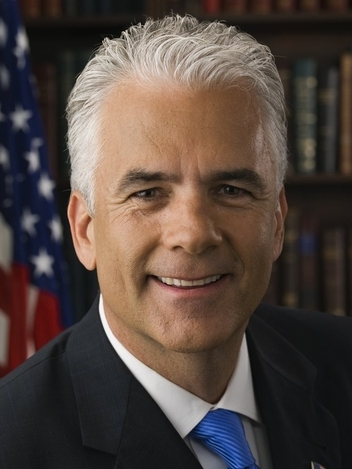
John Ensign
Former U.S. Senator for Nevada

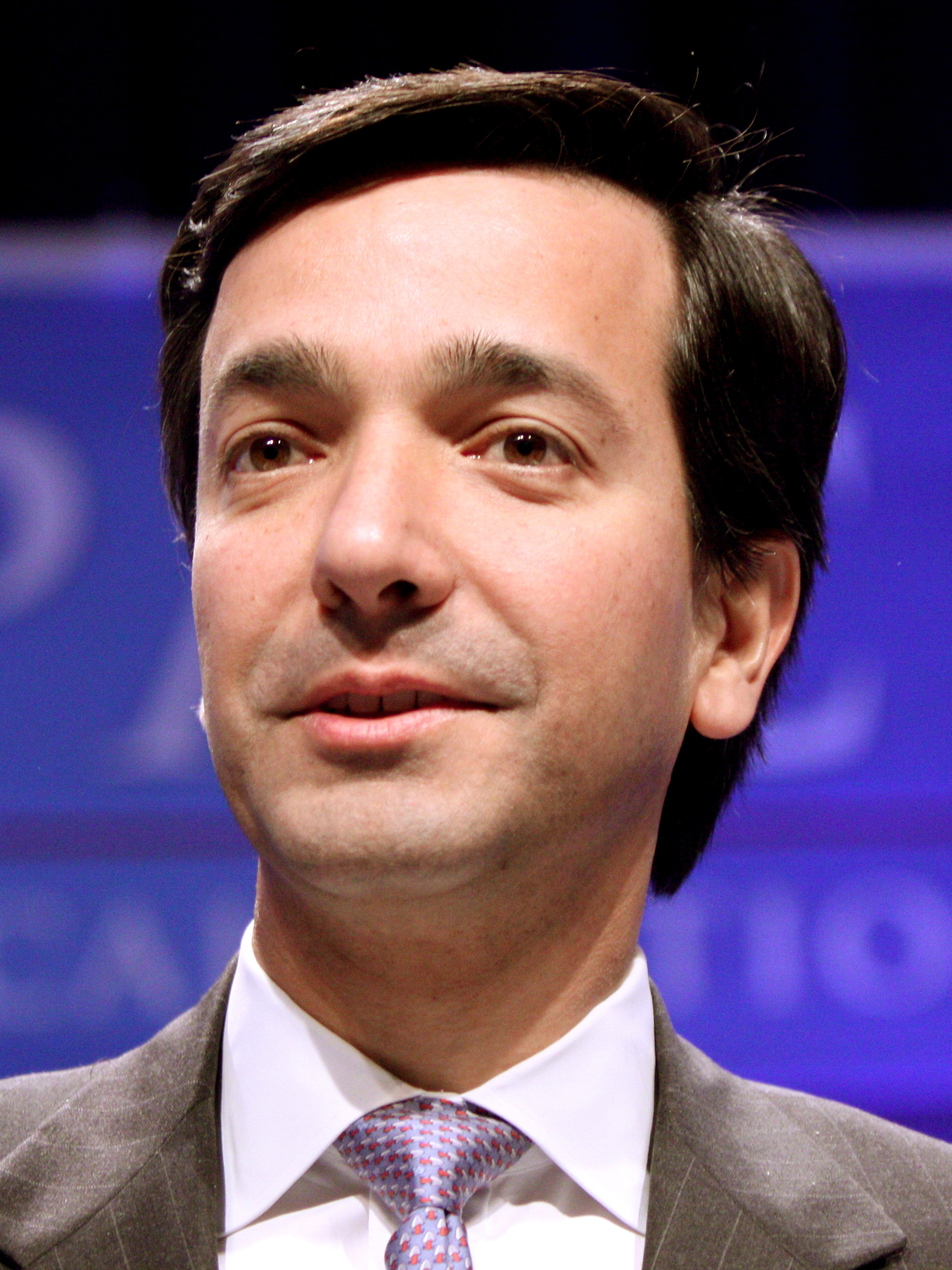
Luis Fortuño
Governor of Puerto Rico
Endorsed Mitt Romney

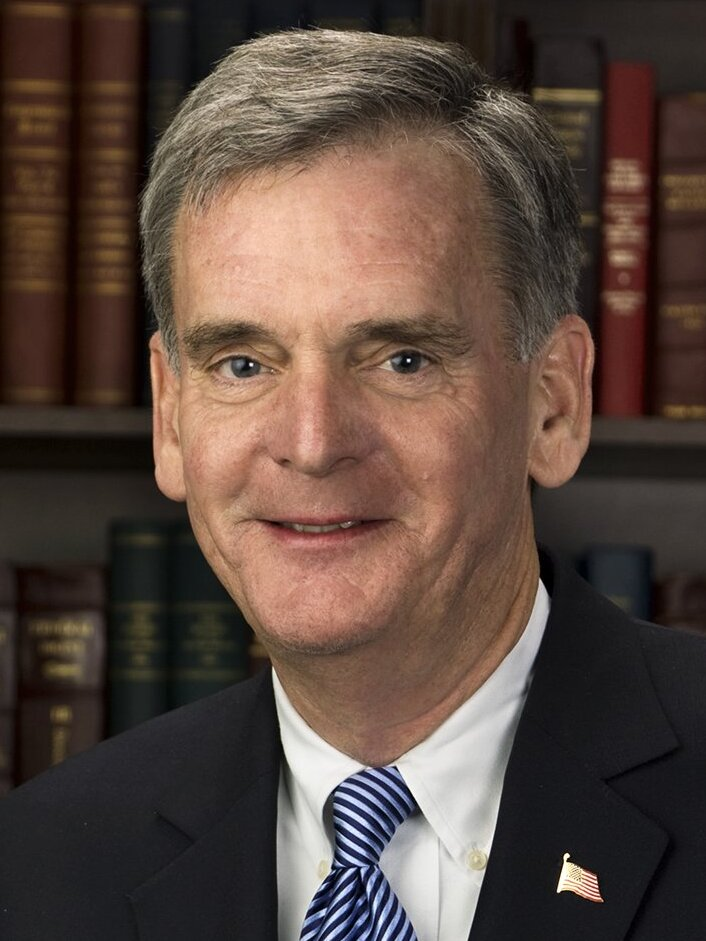
Judd Gregg
Former U.S. Senator for New Hampshire
Endorsed Mitt Romney

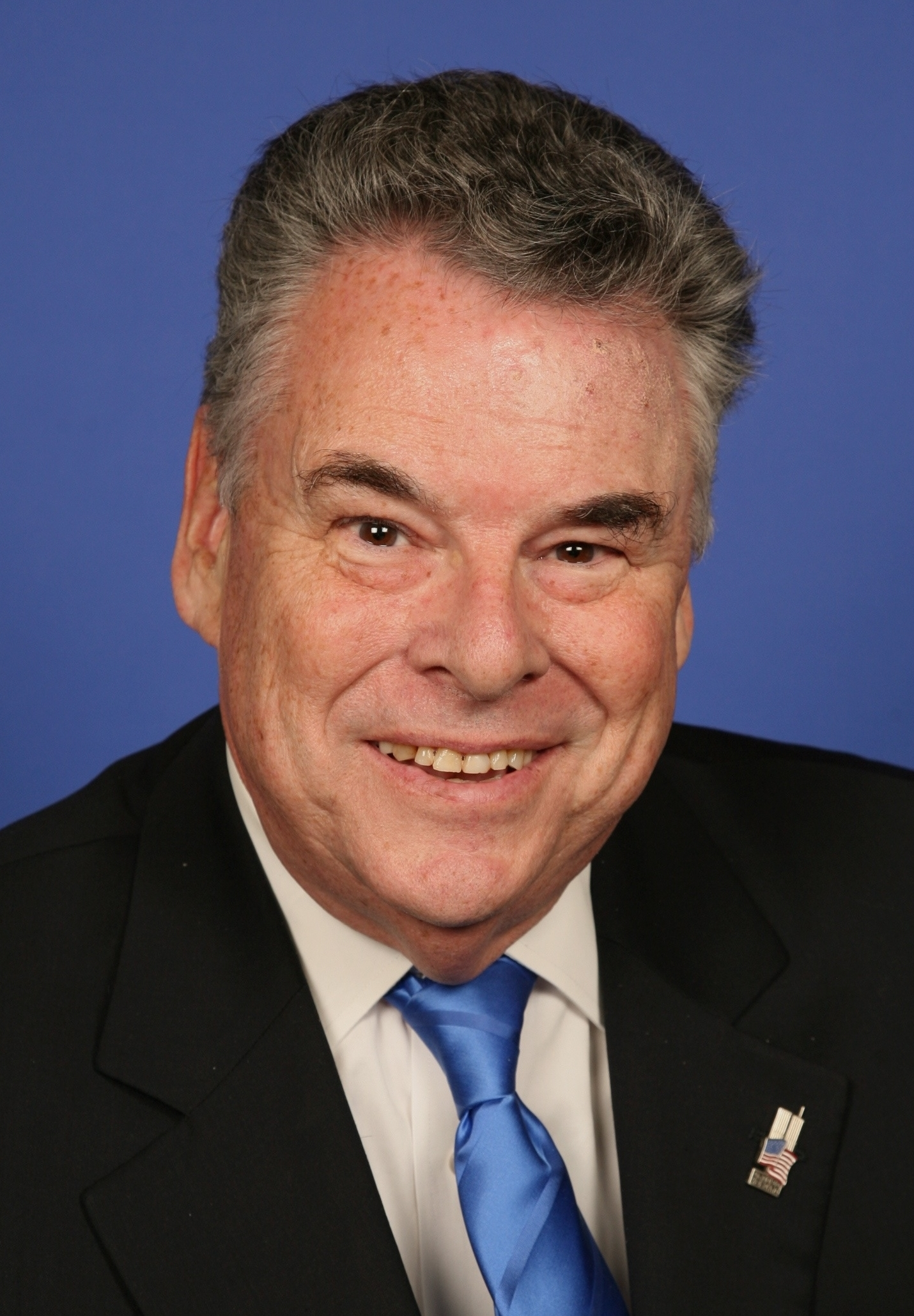
Peter King
U.S. Representative
from New York

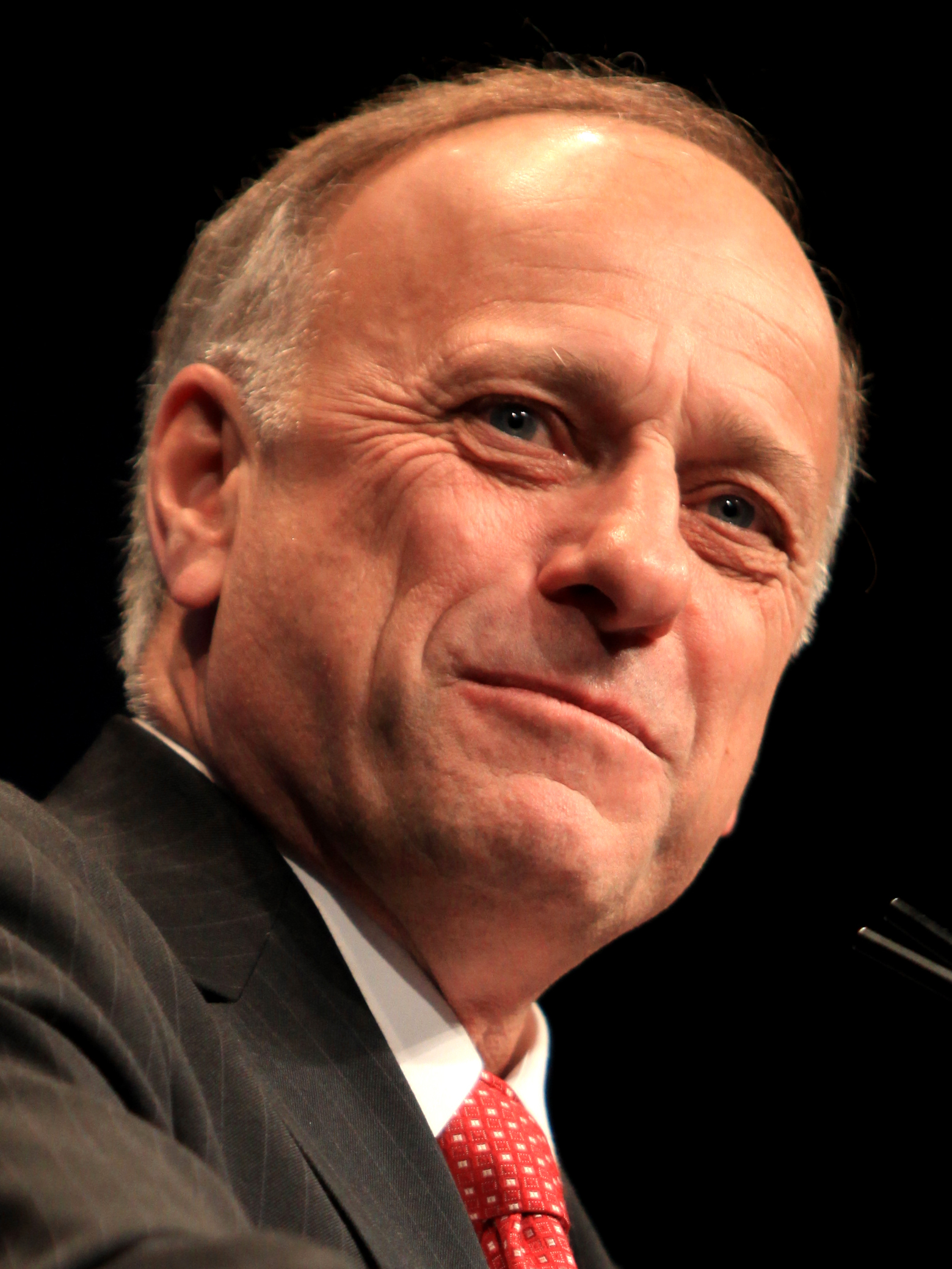
Steve King
U.S. Representative from Iowa

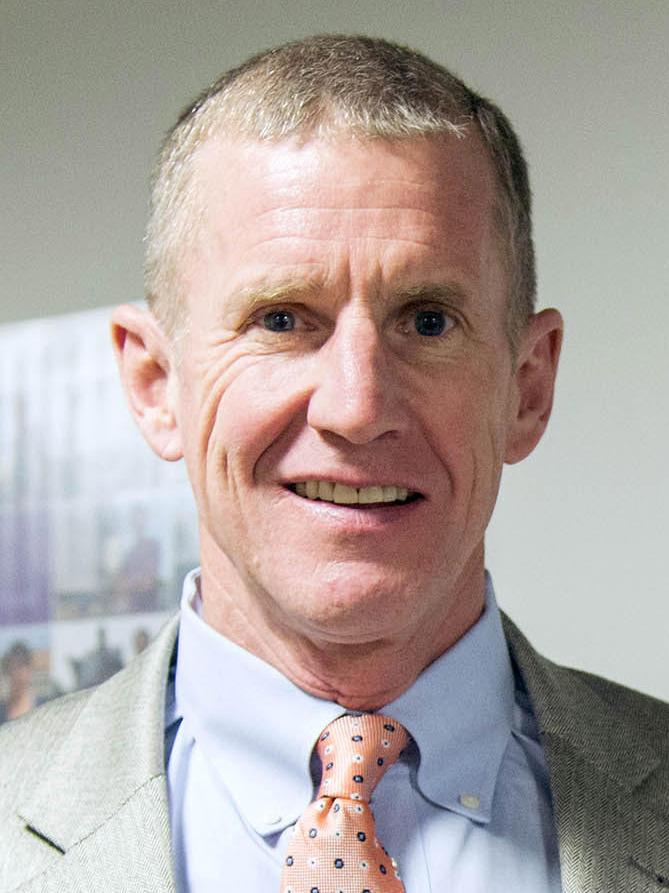
Stanley McChrystal
(from Kansas) Retired General

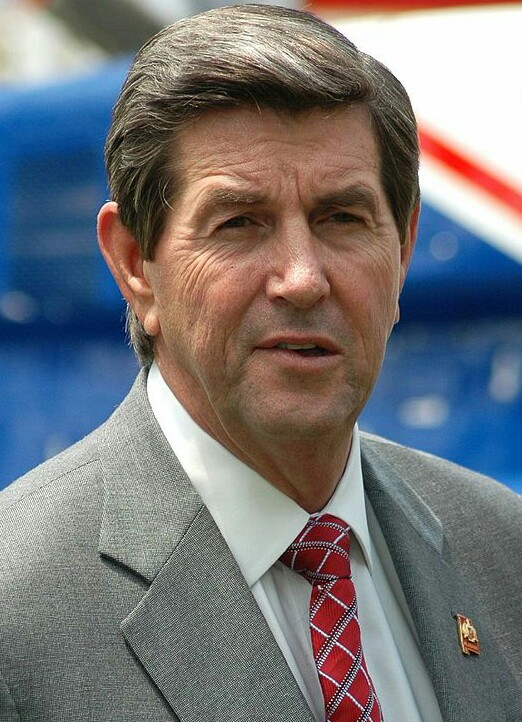
Bob Riley
Former Governor of Alabama

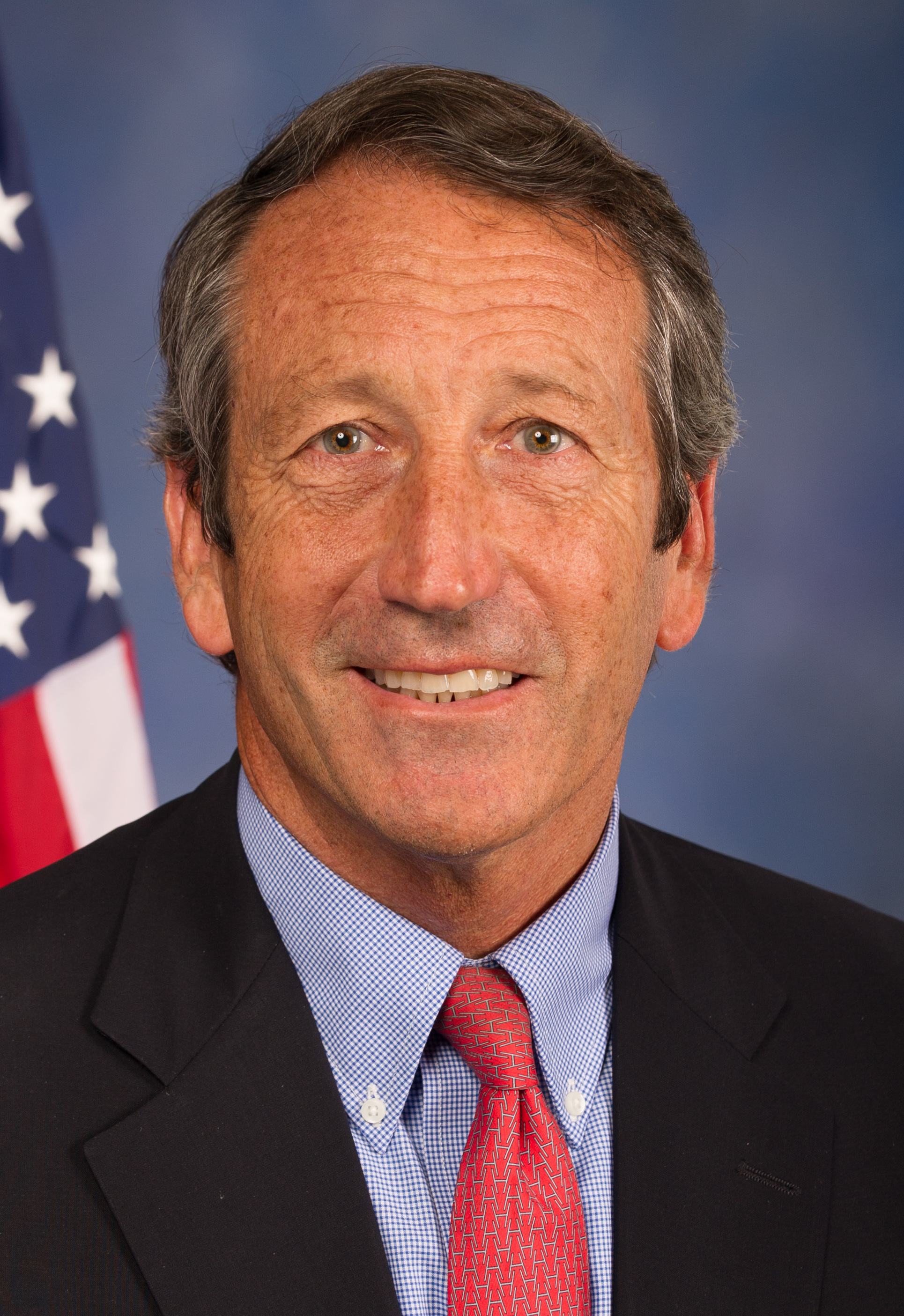
Mark Sanford
Former Governor of South Carolina

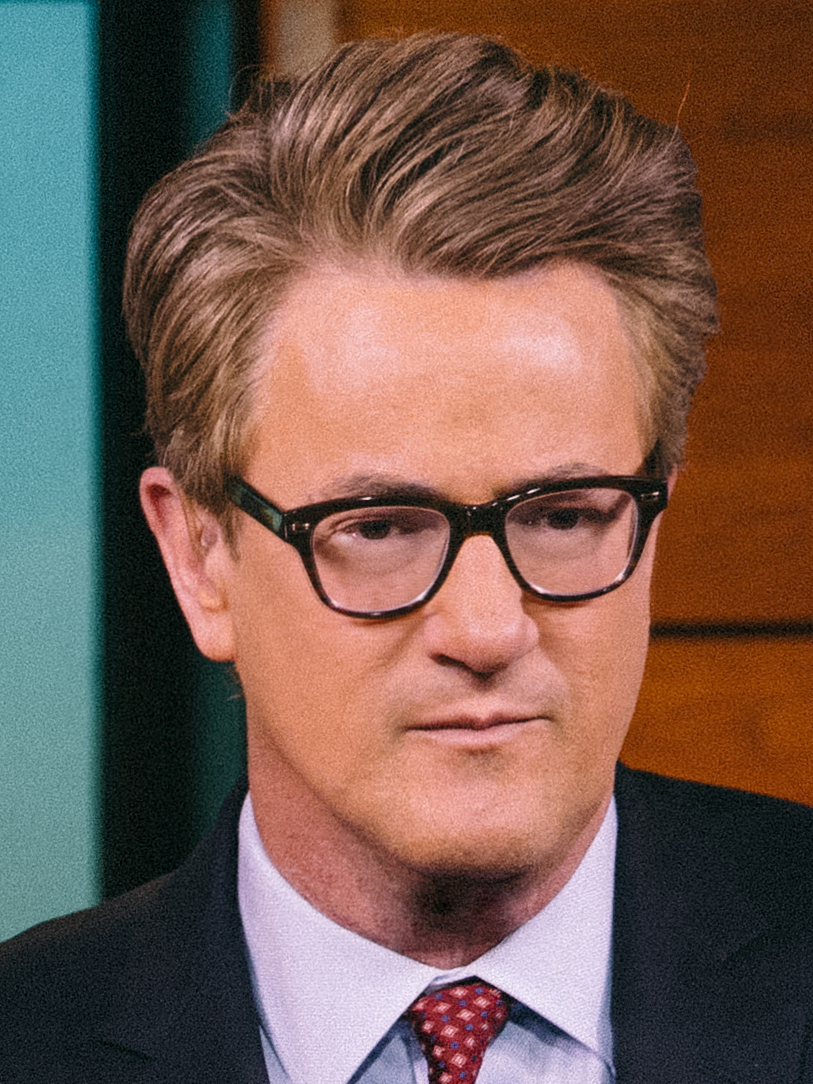
Joe Scarborough
Former U.S. Representative from Florida

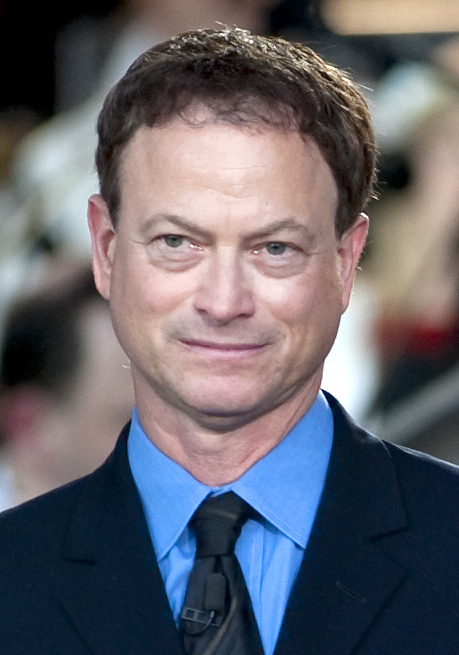
Gary Sinise (from Illinois)
Actor

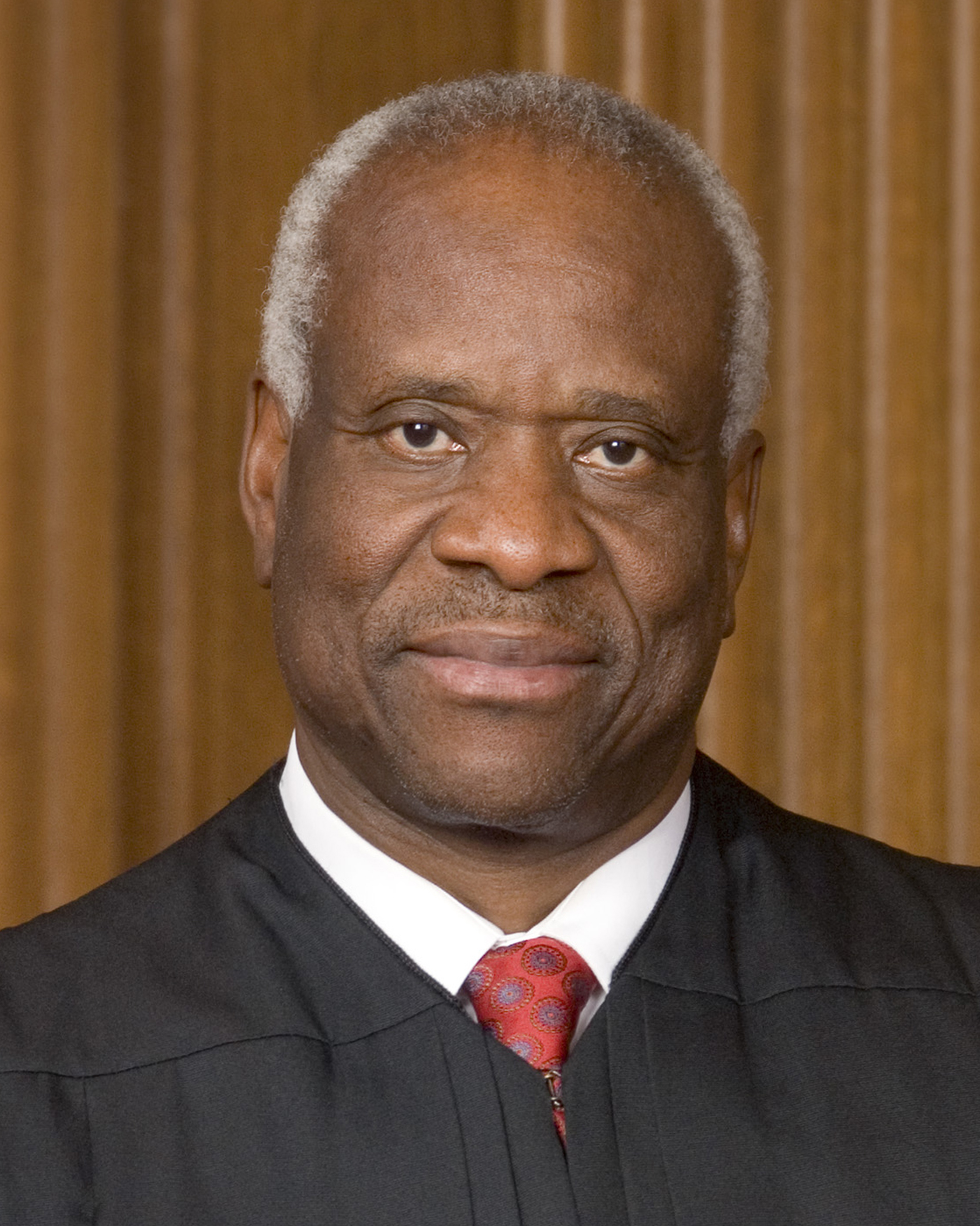
Clarence Thomas (from Georgia)
U.S. Supreme Court Justice

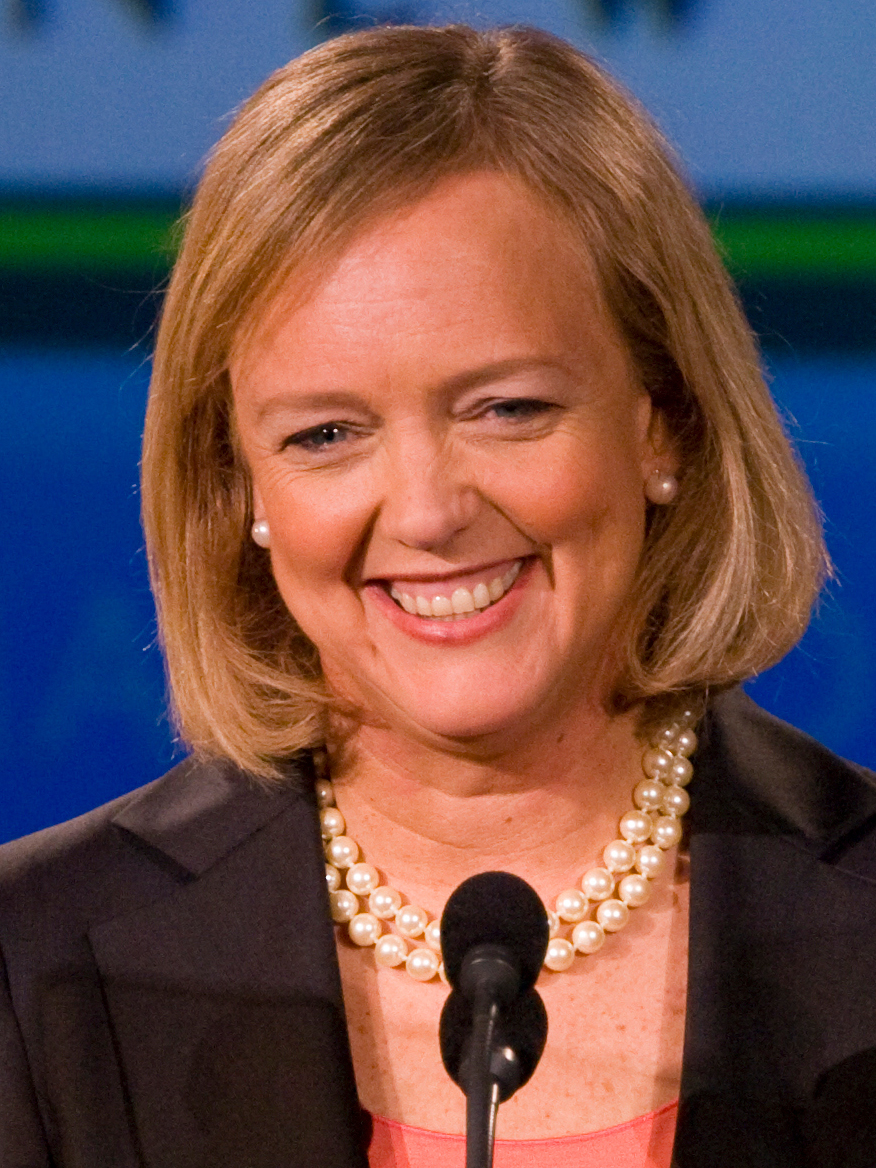
Meg Whitman (from California)
Dot com executive, 2010 nominee for Governor of California
Endorsed Mitt Romney

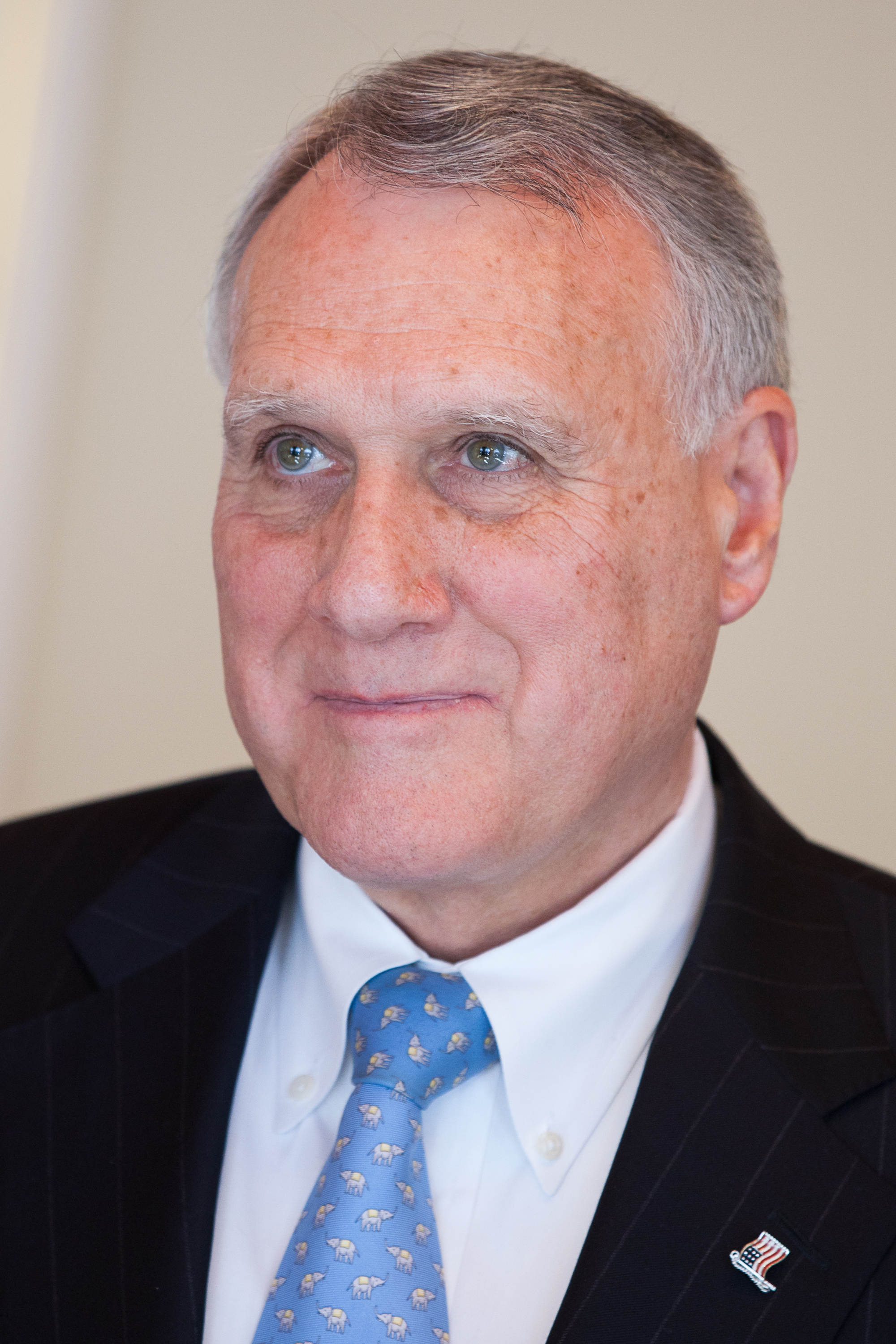
Jon Kyl
U.S. Senator from Arizona
Endorsed Mitt Romney

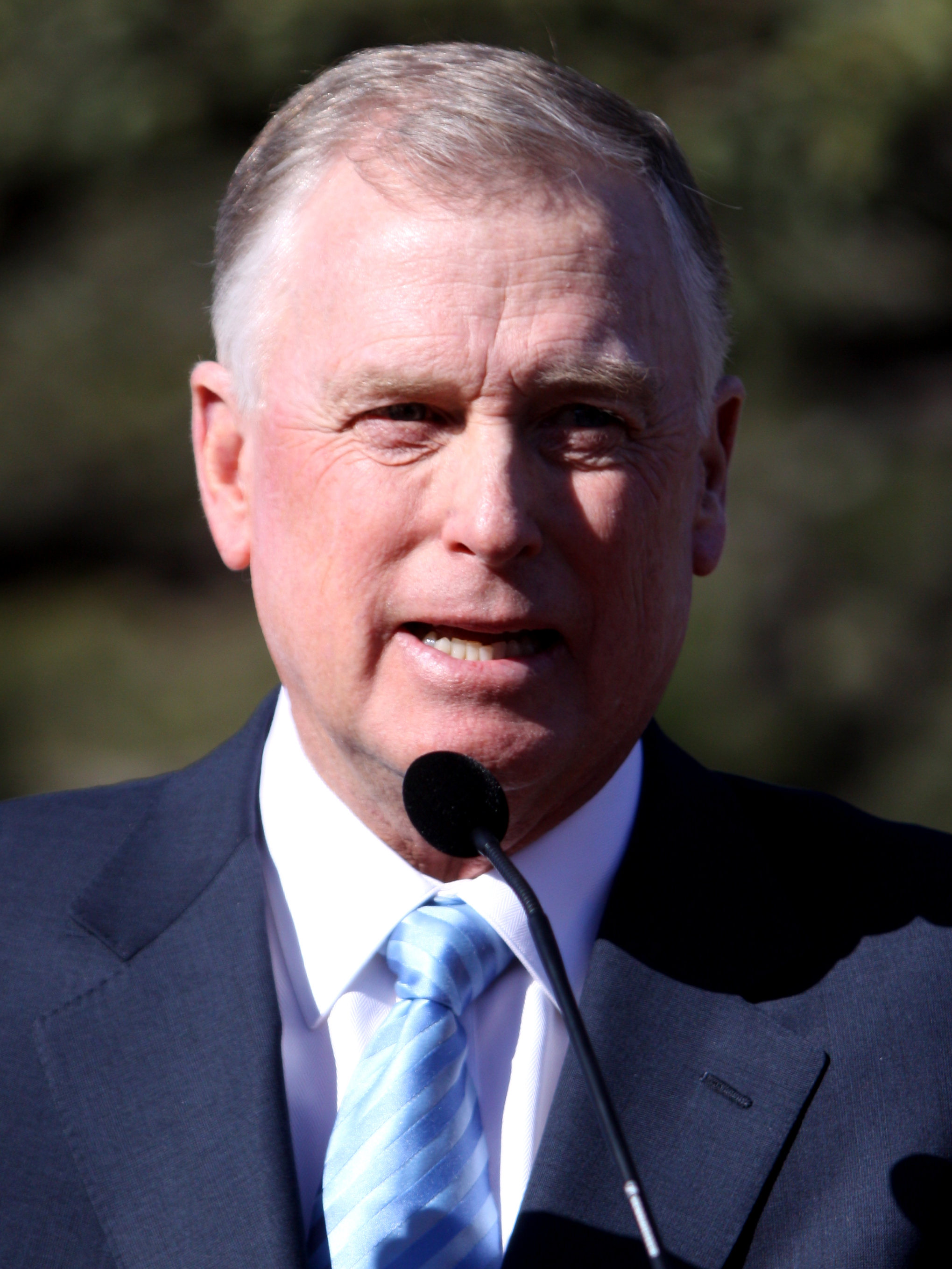
Dan Quayle
Former Vice President from Arizona
Endorsed Mitt Romney

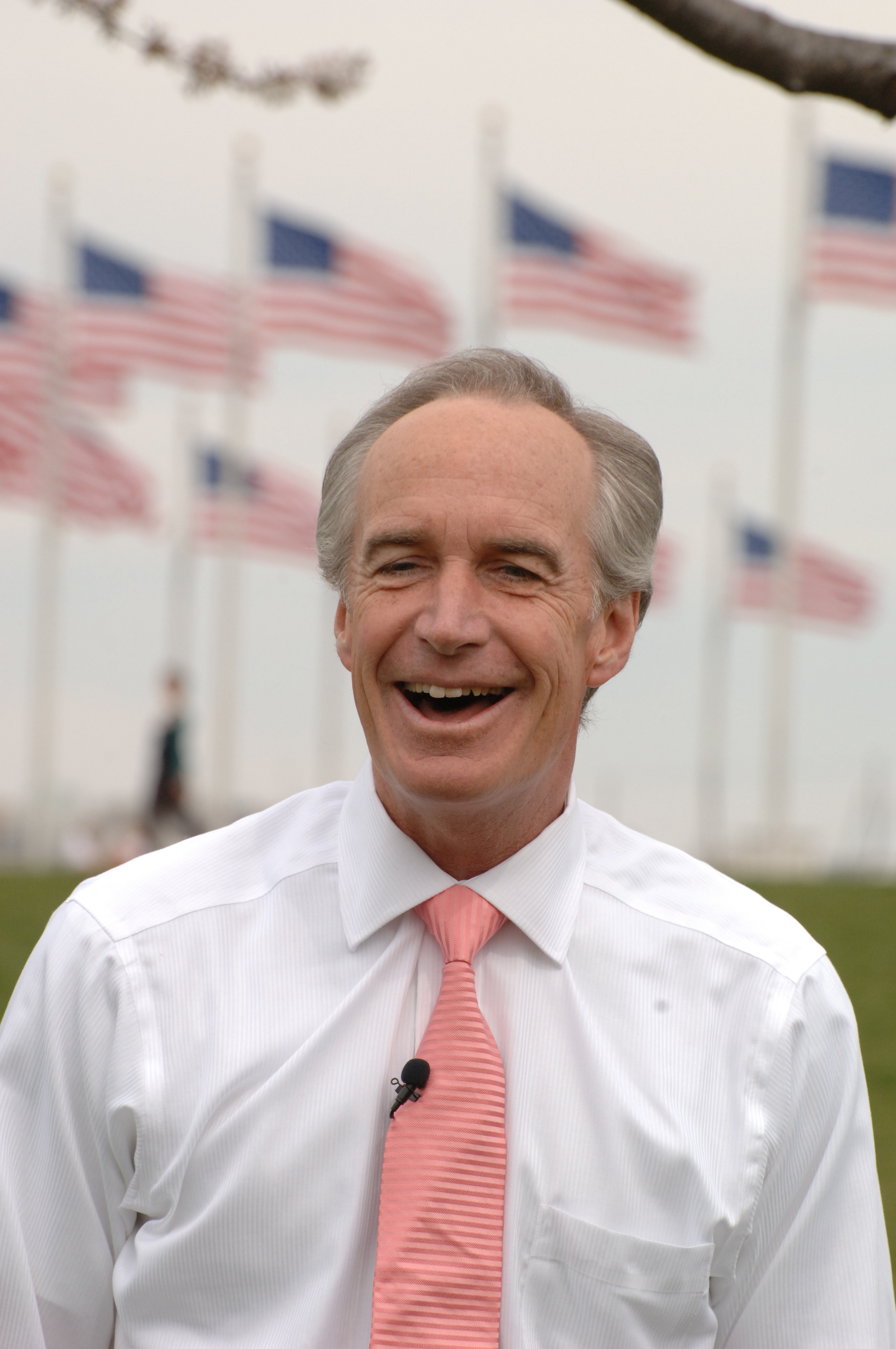
Dirk Kempthorne
Former Secretary of the Interior from Idaho

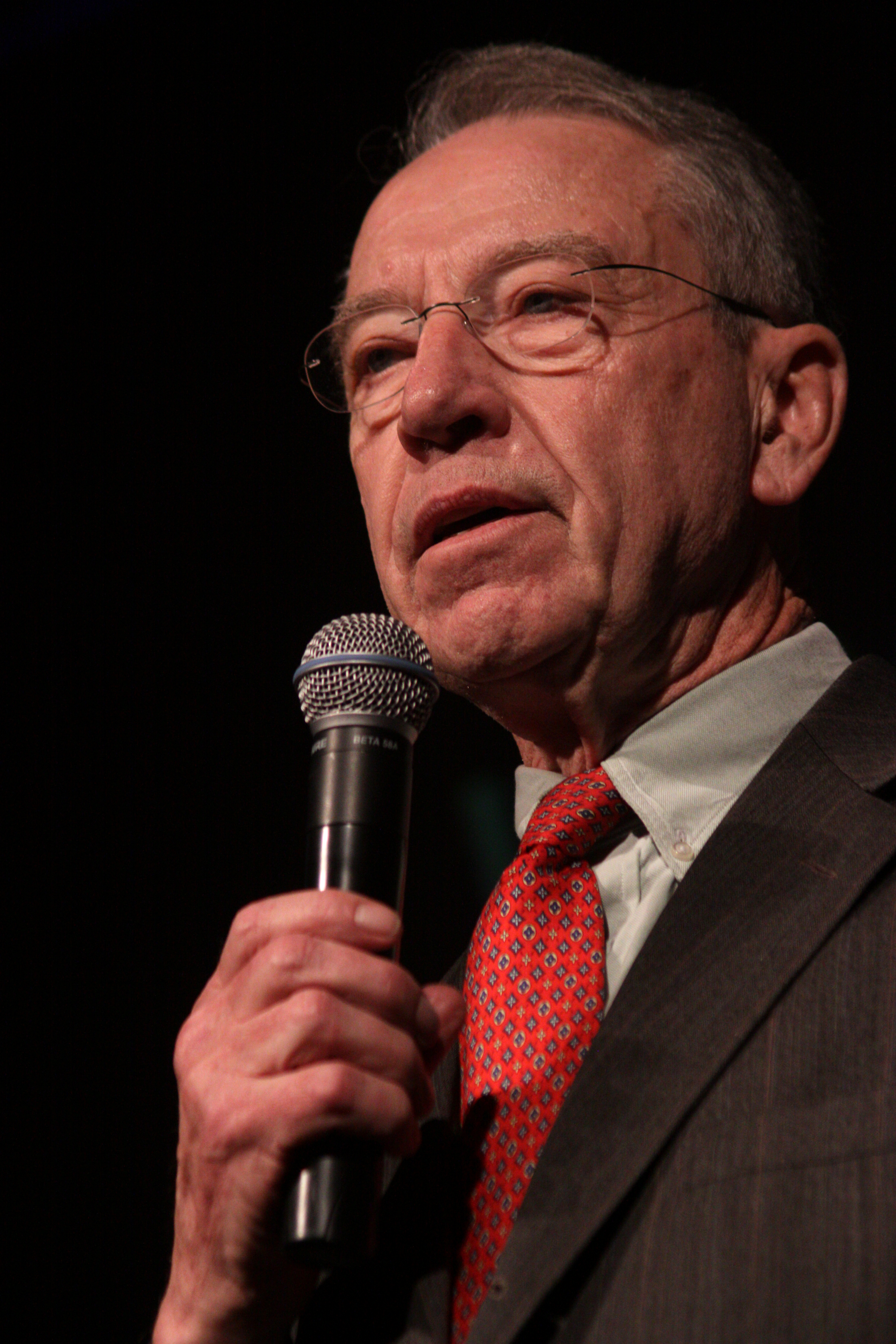
Chuck Grassley
U.S. Senator from Iowa

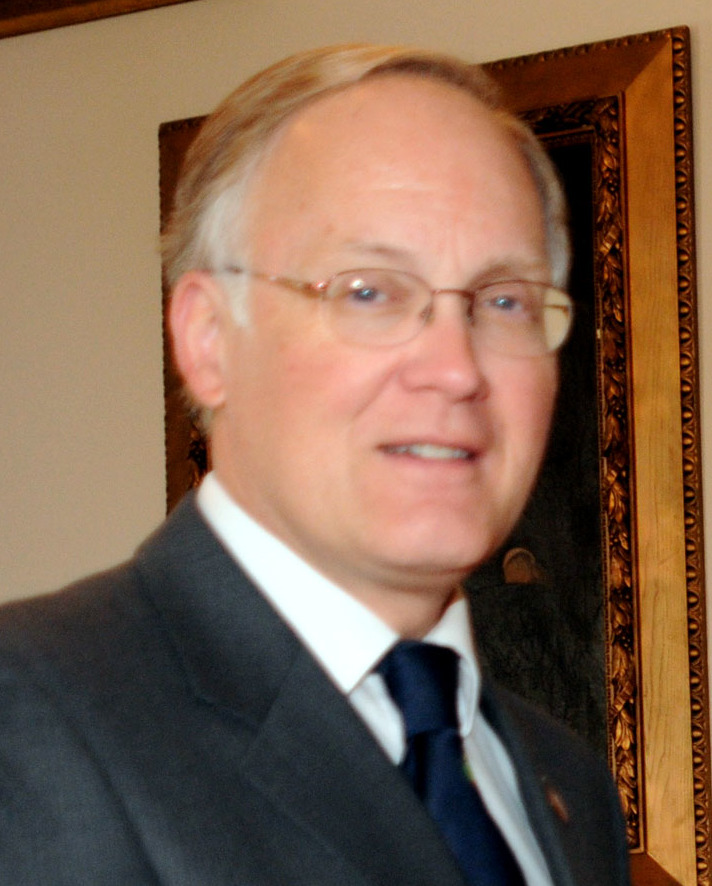
Jim Douglas
Governor of Vermont

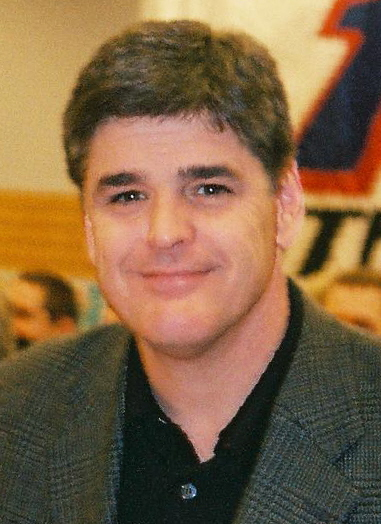
Sean Hannity
Pundit from New York

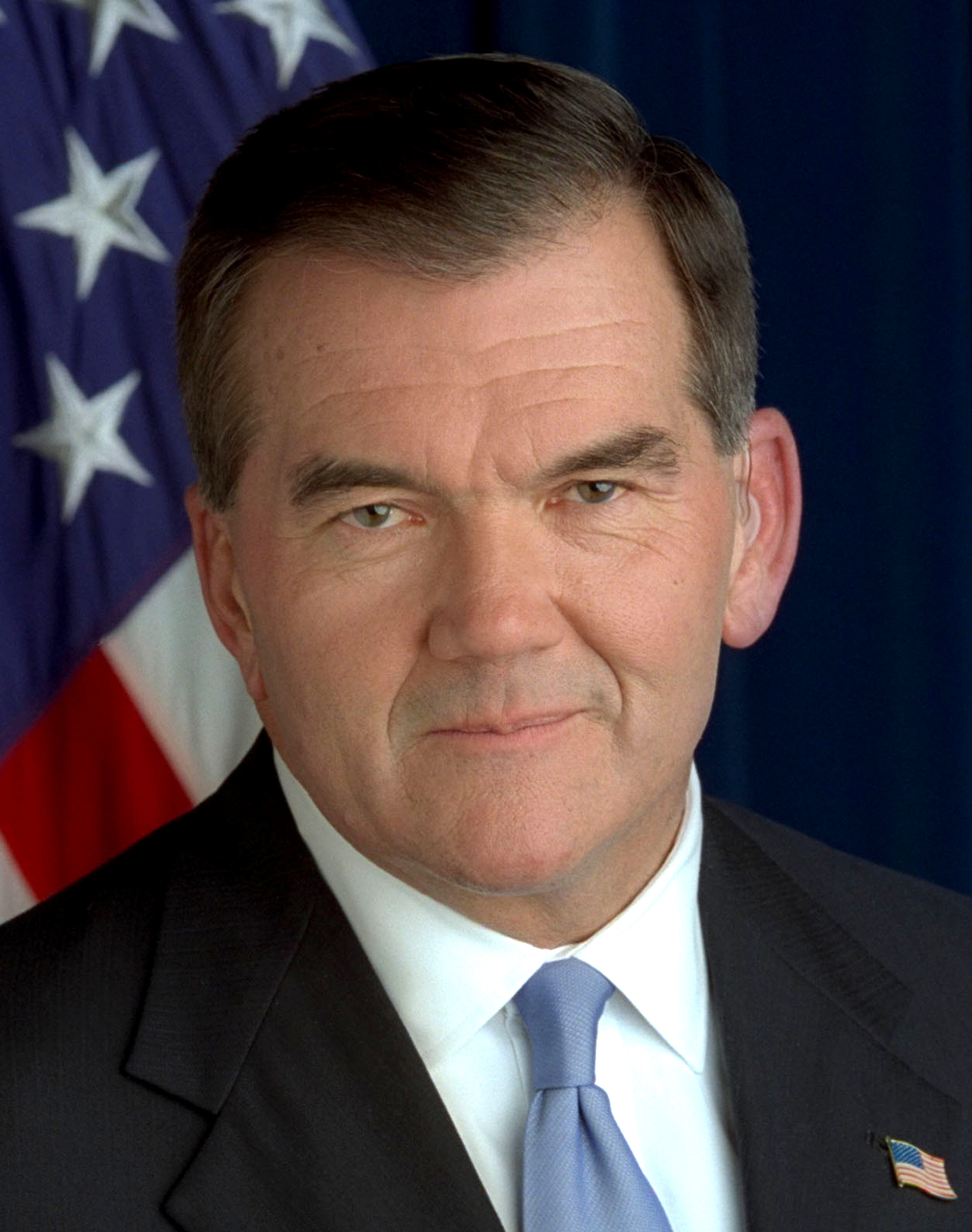
Tom Ridge
Former Secretary of Homeland Security from Pennsylvania

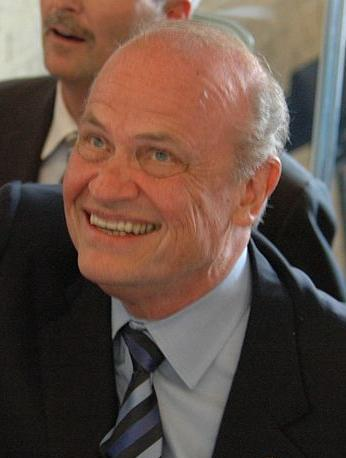
Fred Thompson
Former U.S. Senator from Tennessee

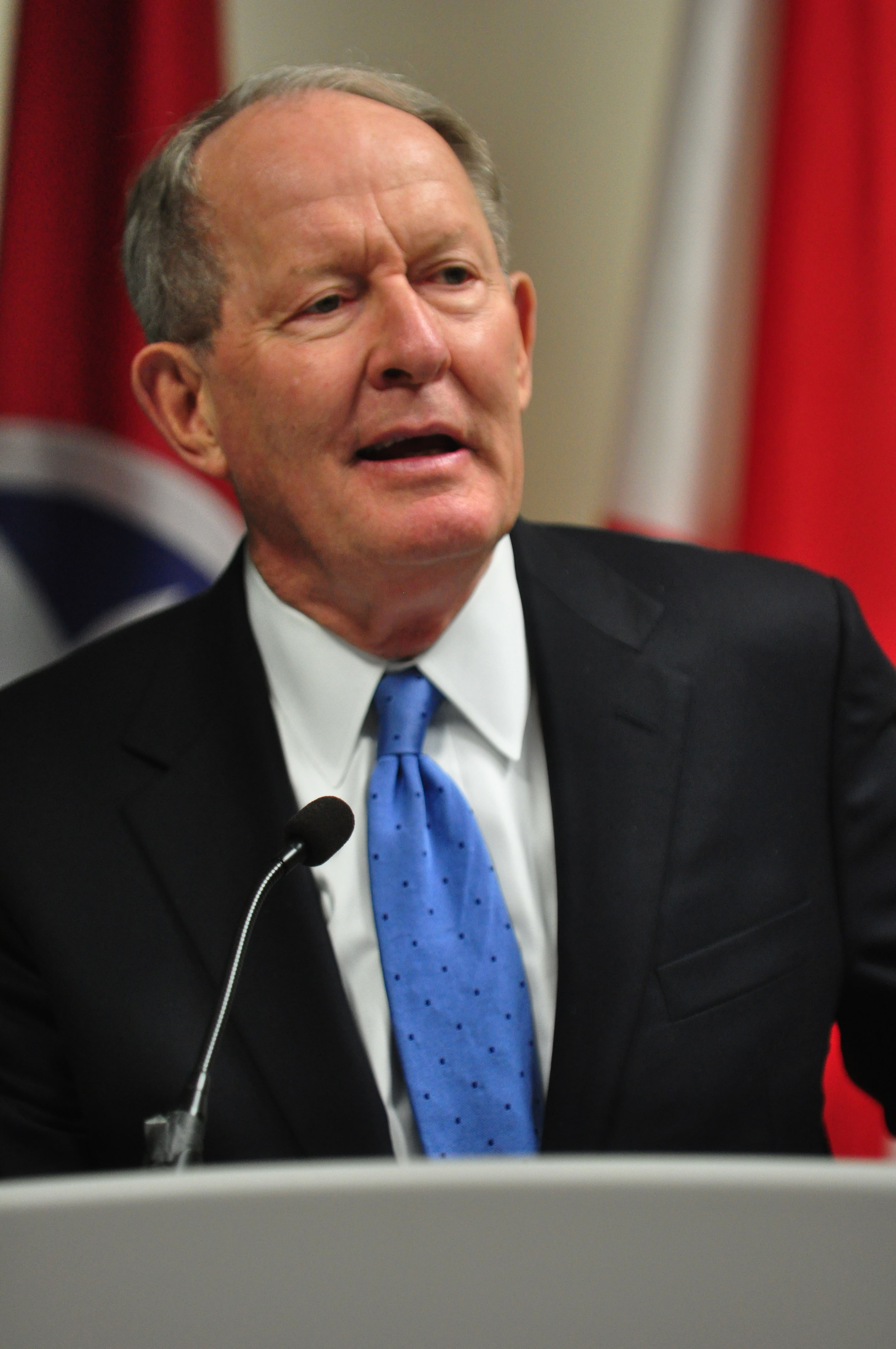
Lamar Alexander
U.S. Senator from Tennessee

=== Declined to run ===
The following people, who were speculated to be potential candidates for the Republican Party's presidential nomination clearly and unequivocally denied interest publicly, released Shermanesque statements, or declared candidacy for a different political office in 2012.

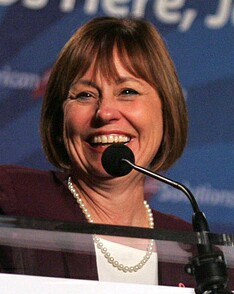
Sharron Angle
Former Assemblywoman, 2010 nominee for US Senate from Nevada
Endorsed Rick Santorum

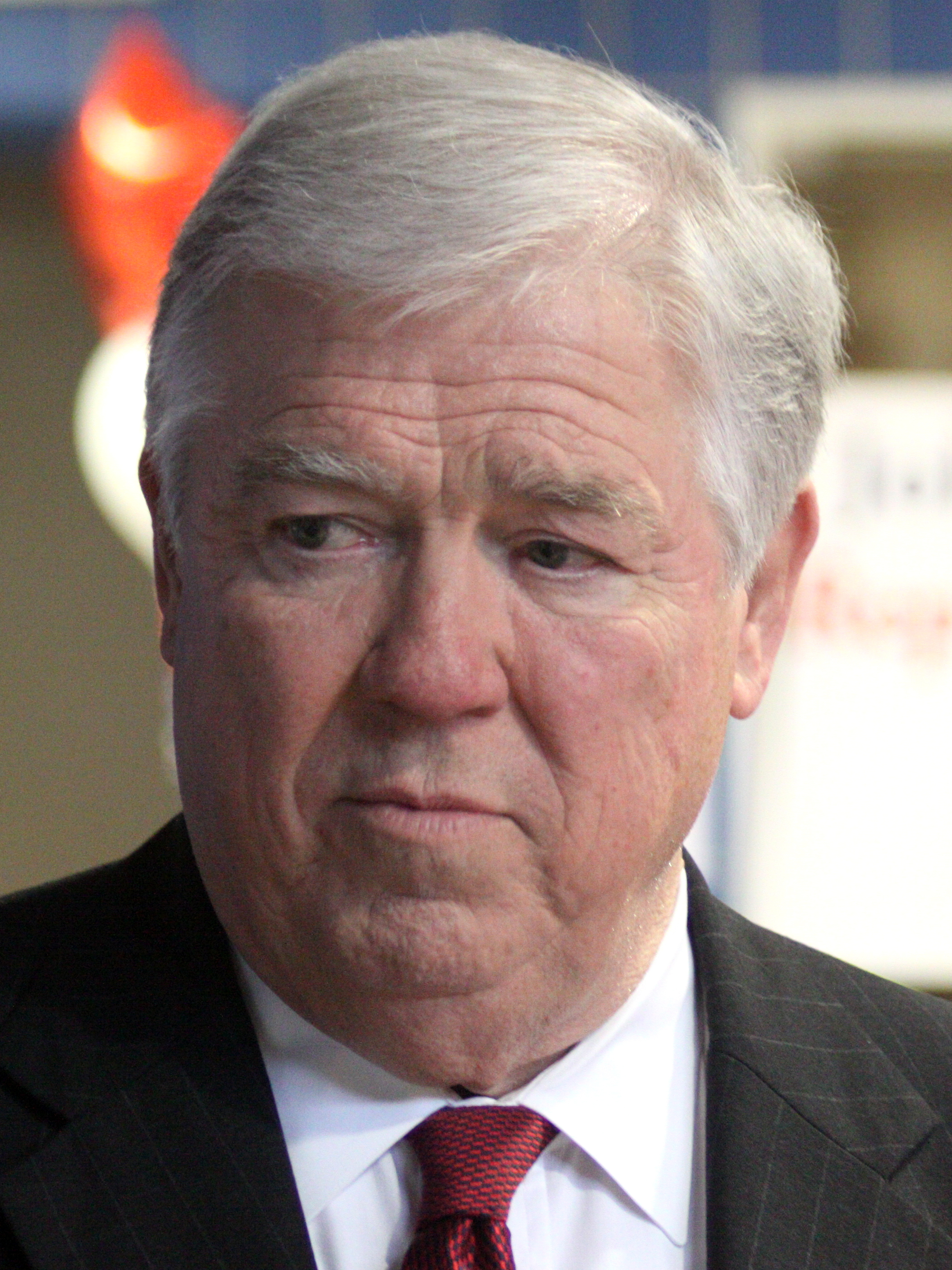
Haley Barbour
Former Governor of Mississippi

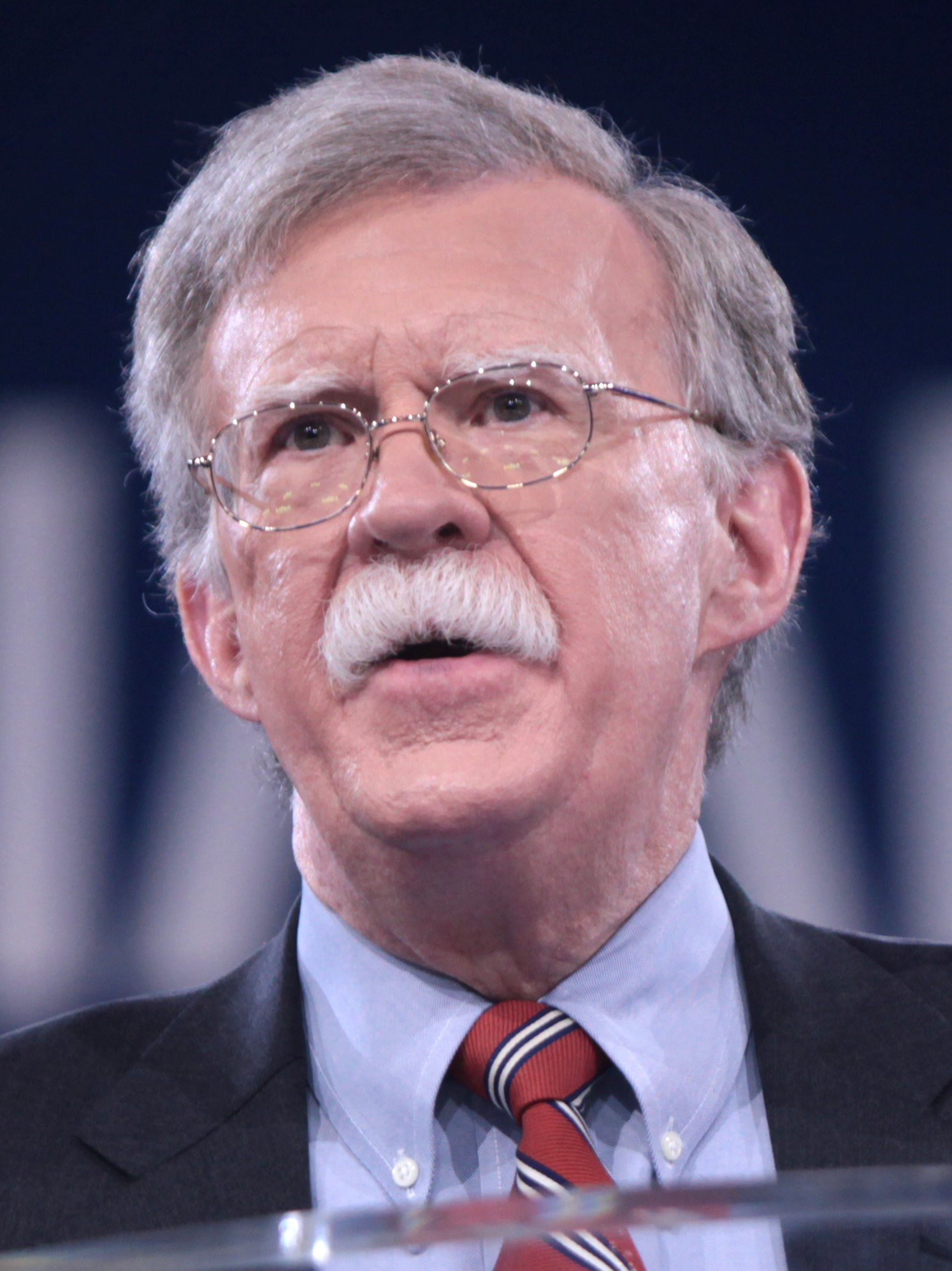
John R. Bolton
Former U.S. Ambassador to the United Nations
Endorsed Mitt Romney

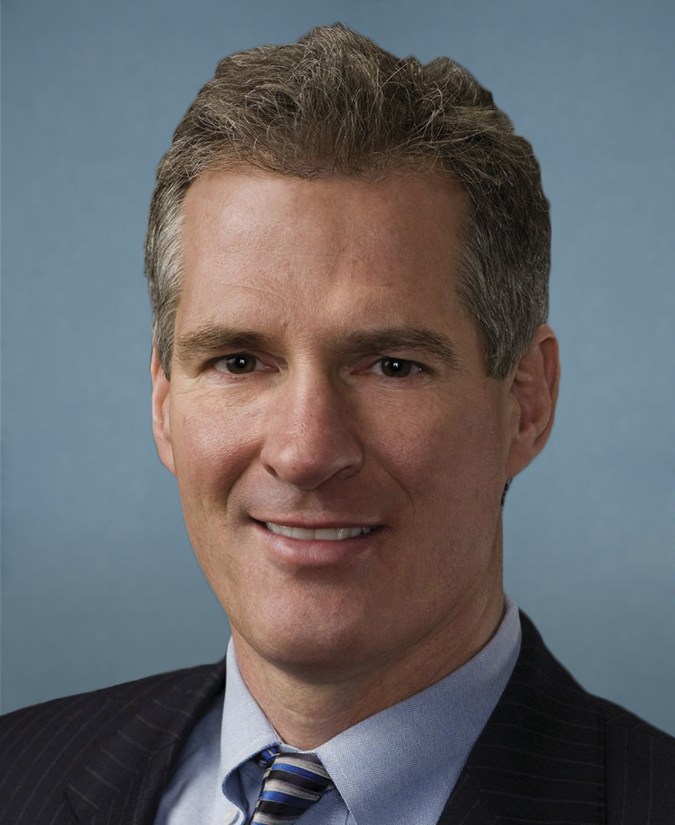
Scott Brown
U.S. Senator for Massachusetts
Endorsed Mitt Romney

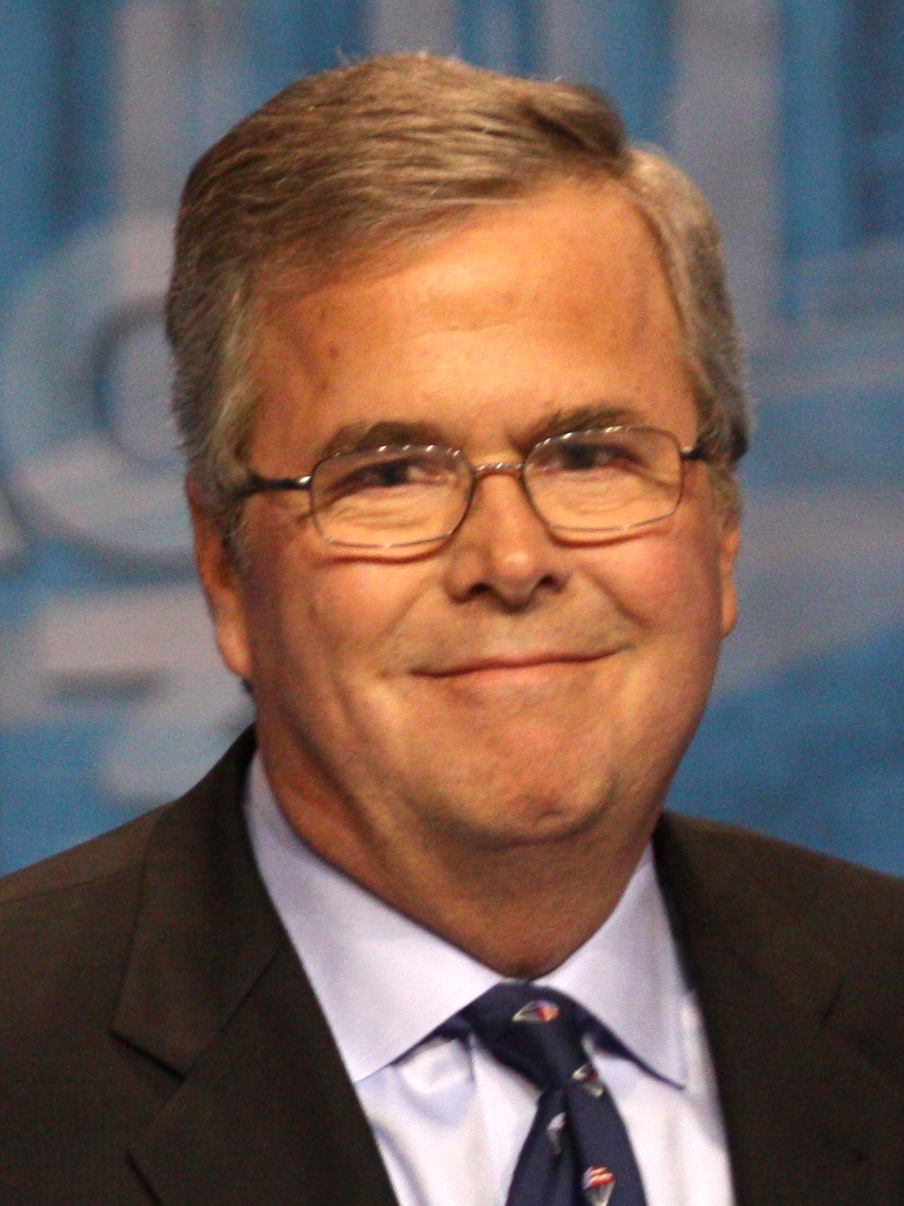
Jeb Bush
Former Governor of Florida
Endorsed Mitt Romney

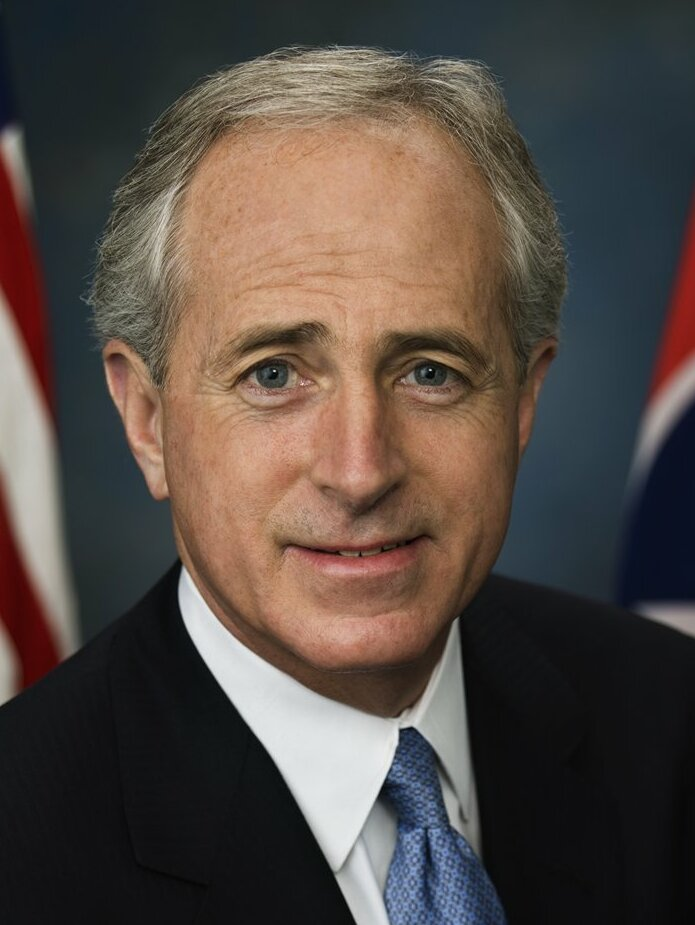
Bob Corker
U.S. Senator for Tennessee

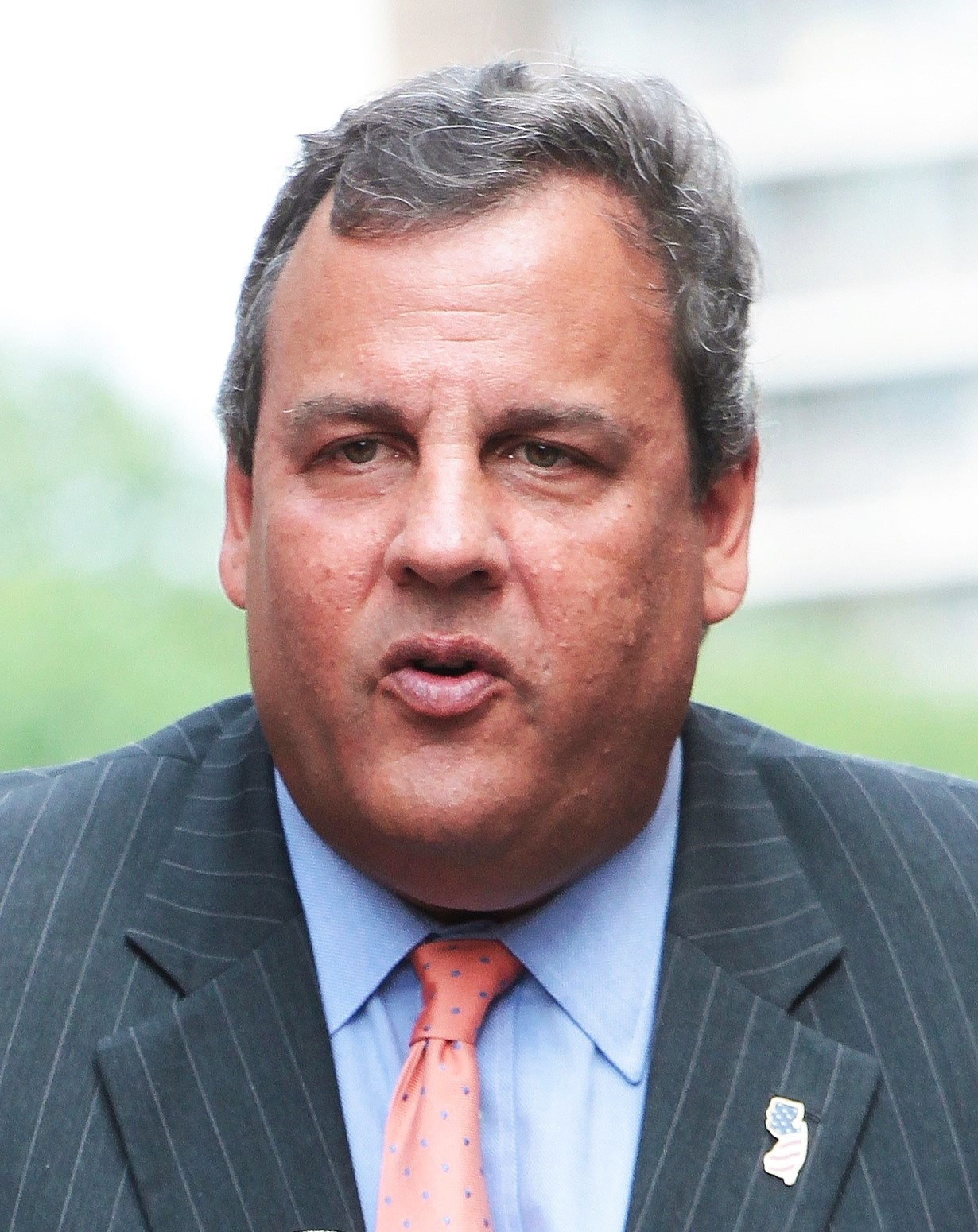
Chris Christie
Governor of New Jersey
Endorsed Mitt Romney

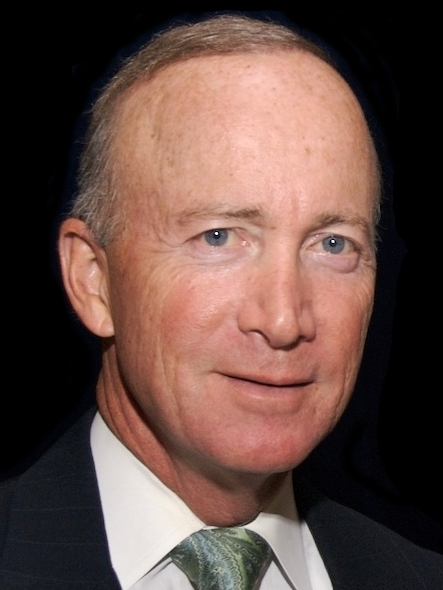
Mitch Daniels
Governor of Indiana
Endorsed Mitt Romney

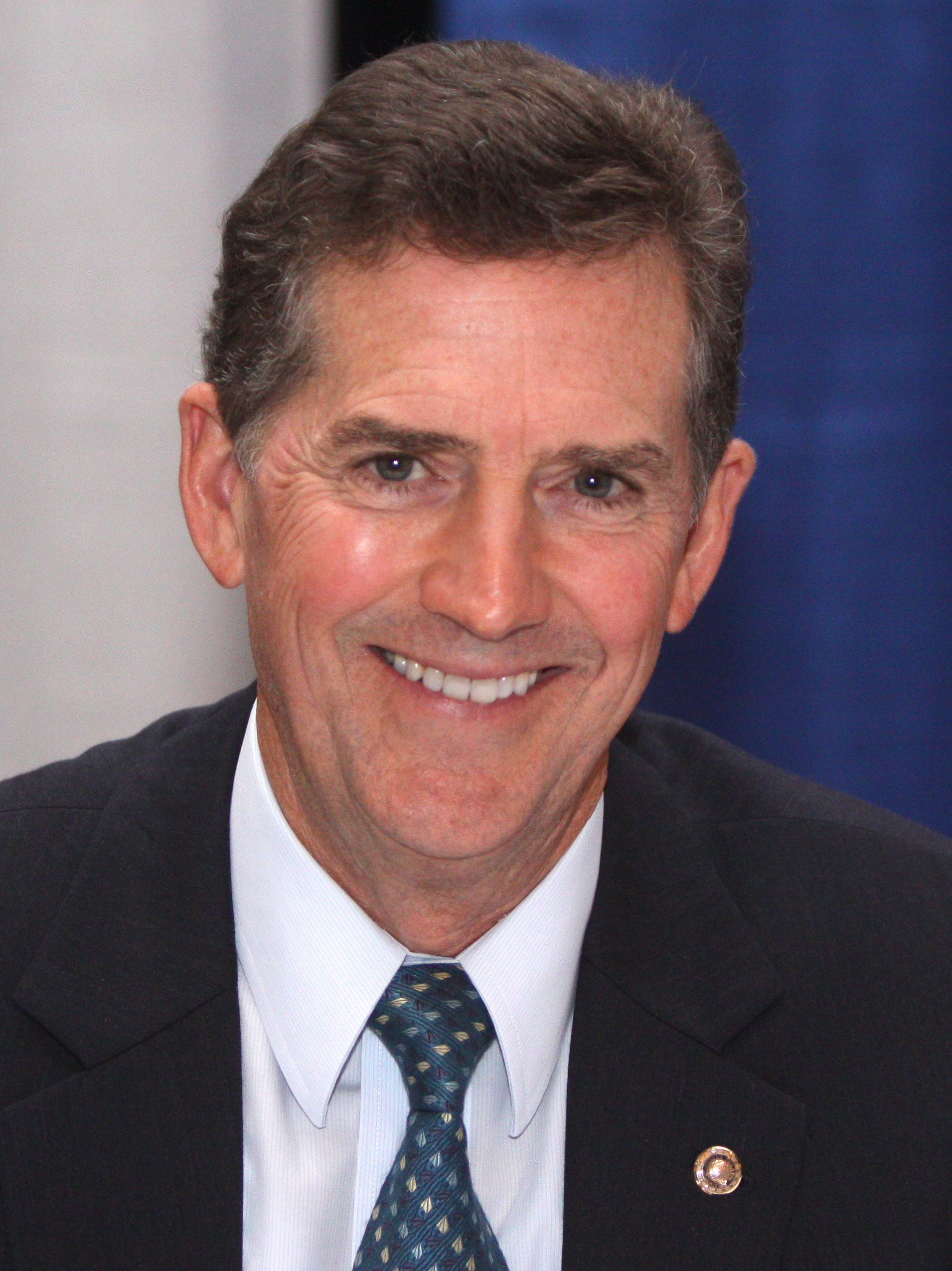
Jim DeMint
U.S. Senator for South Carolina

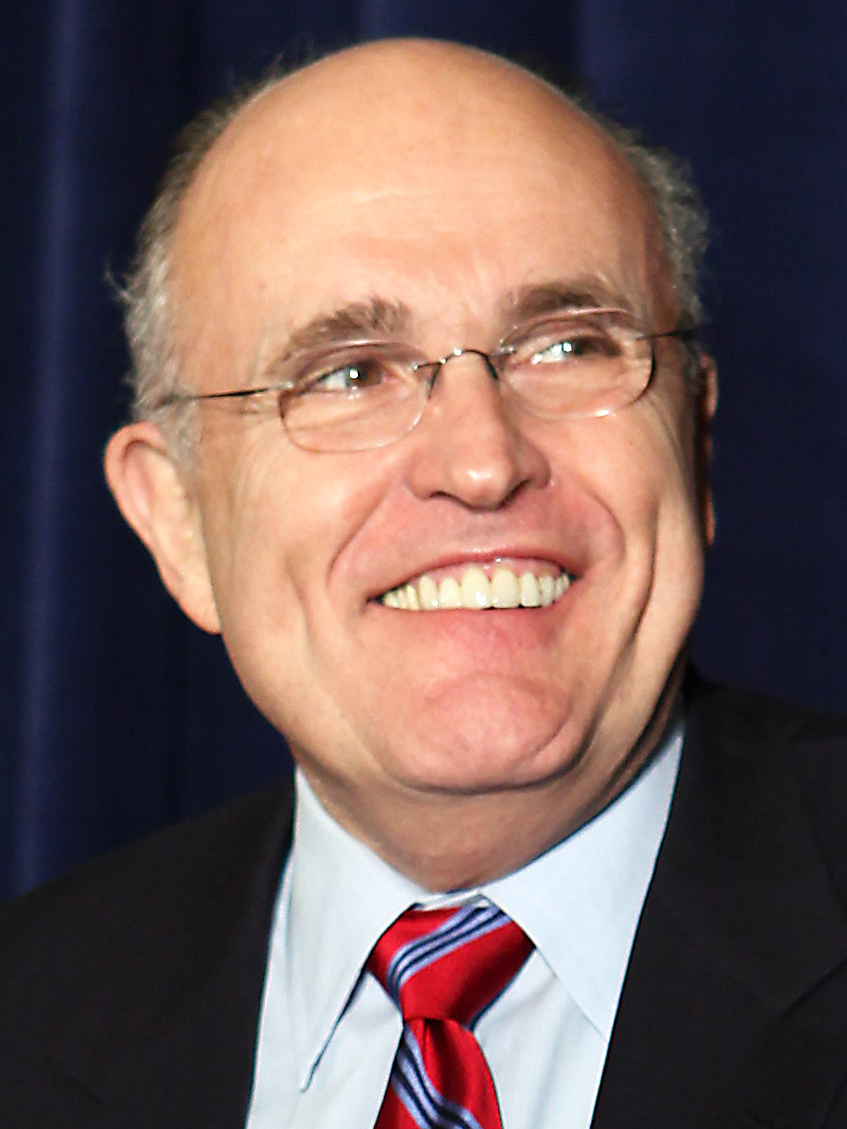
Rudy Giuliani
Former Mayor of New York City
Endorsed Mitt Romney

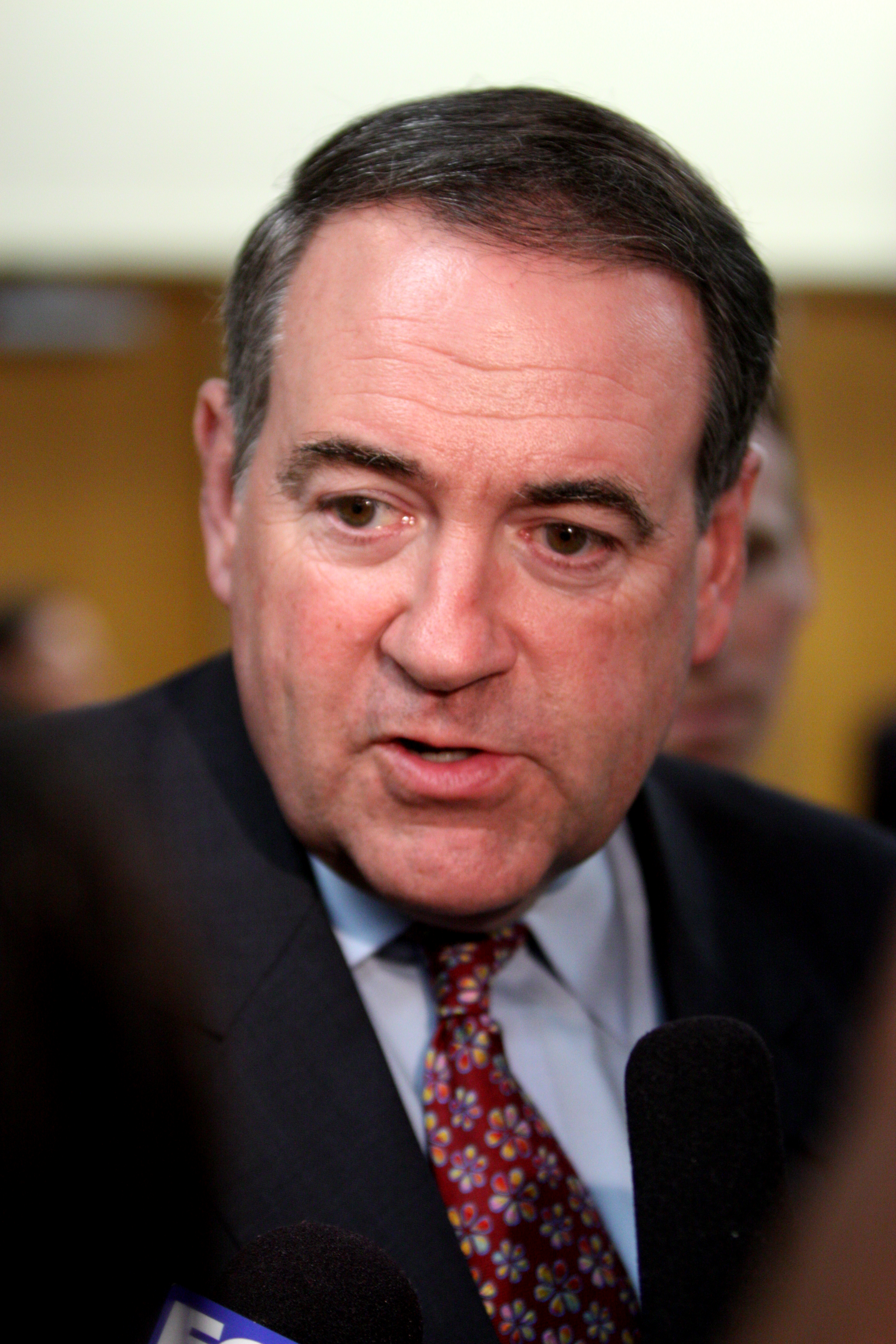
Mike Huckabee
Former Governor of Arkansas

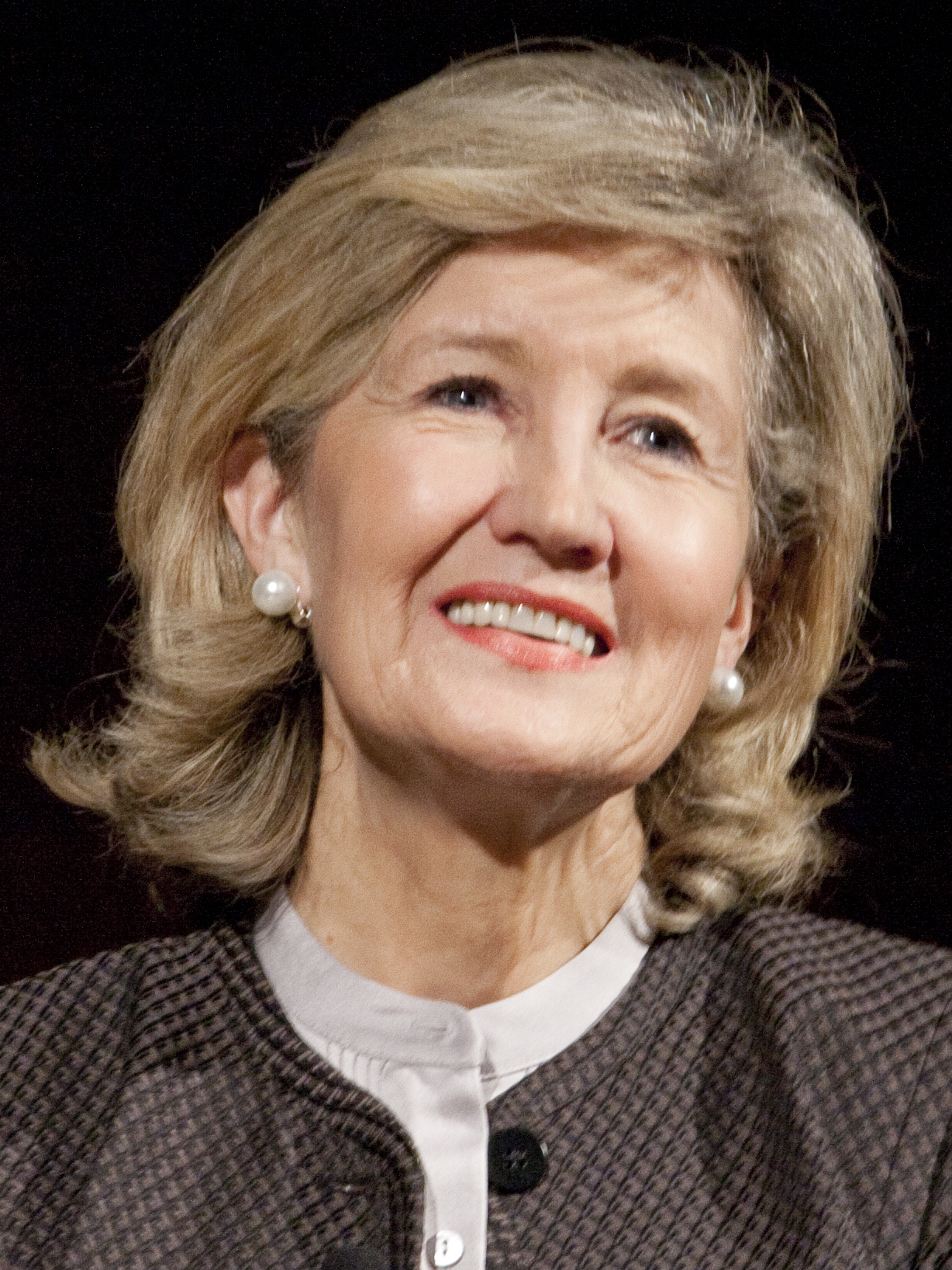
Kay Bailey Hutchison
U.S. Senator for Texas

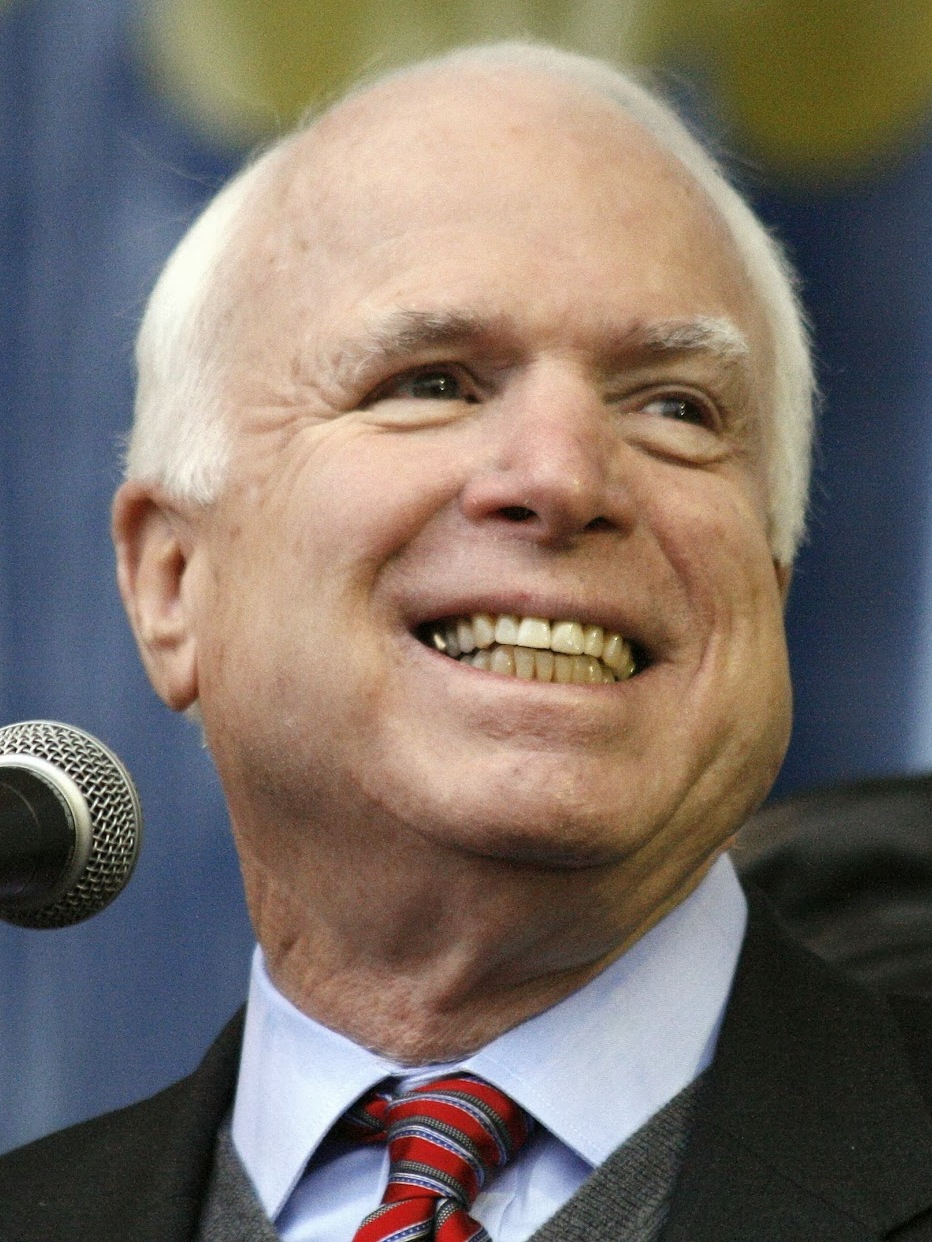
John McCain
U.S. Senator for Arizona and 2008 GOP Presidential nominee
Endorsed Mitt Romney

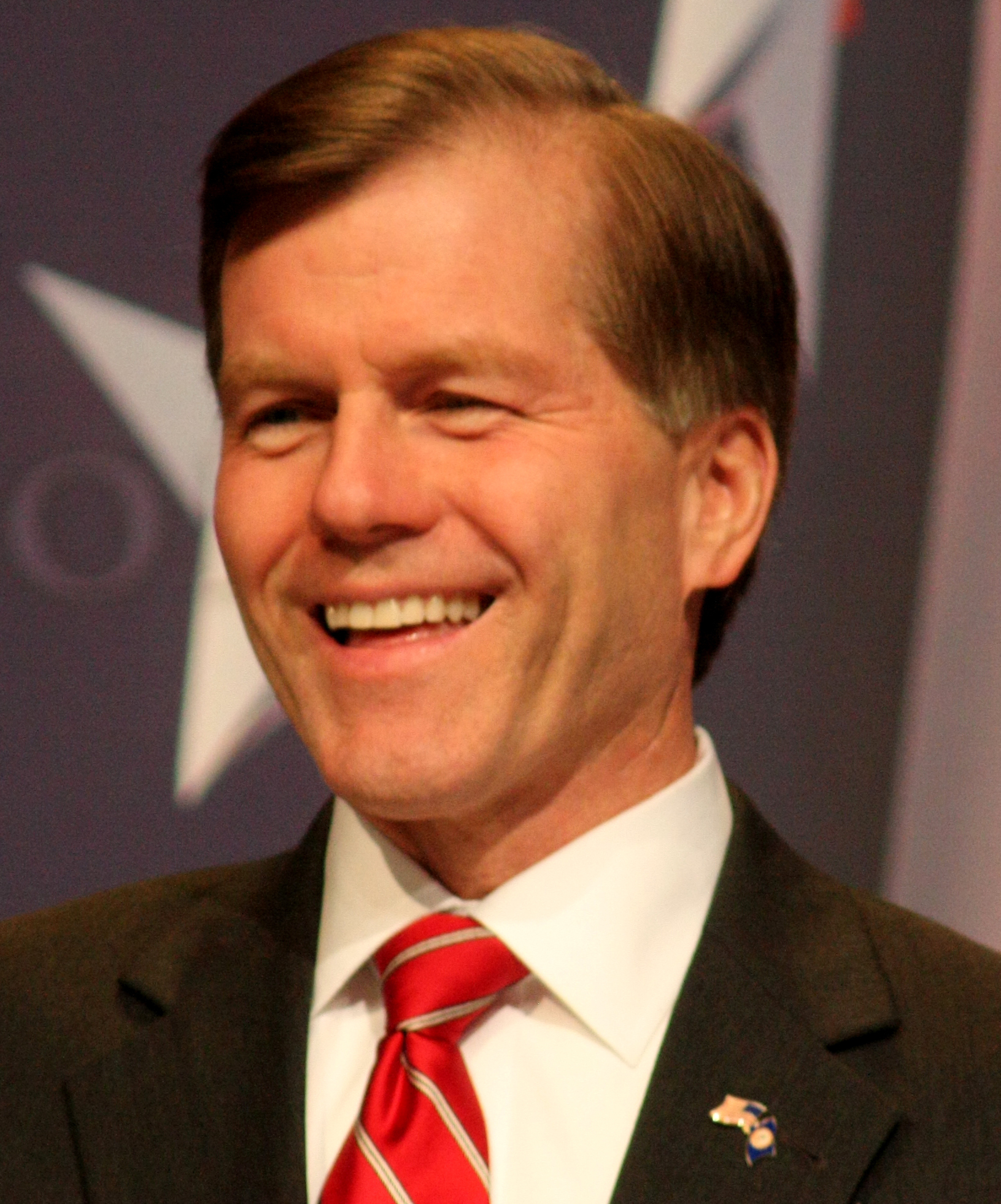
Bob McDonnell
Governor of Virginia
Endorsed Mitt Romney

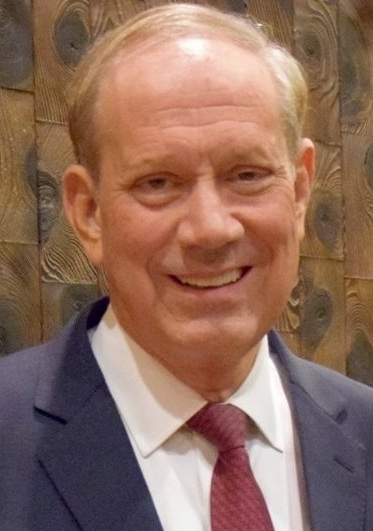
George Pataki
Former Governor of New York
Endorsed Mitt Romney

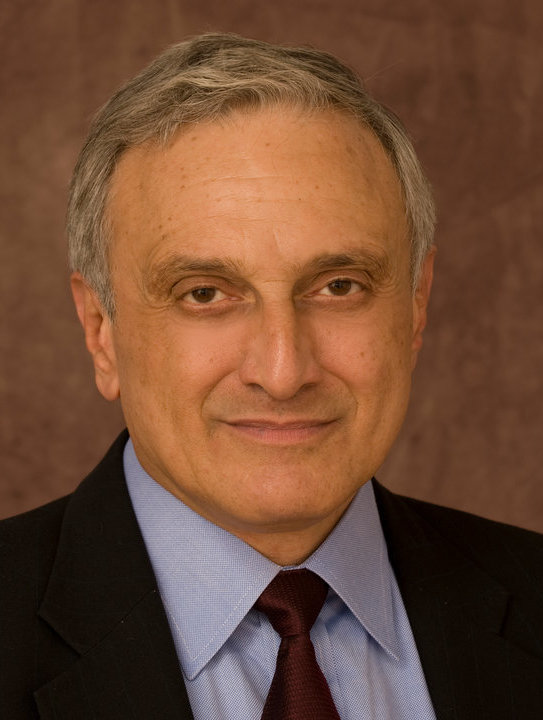
Carl Paladino
Real estate magnate and political activist from New York
Endorsed Newt Gingrich

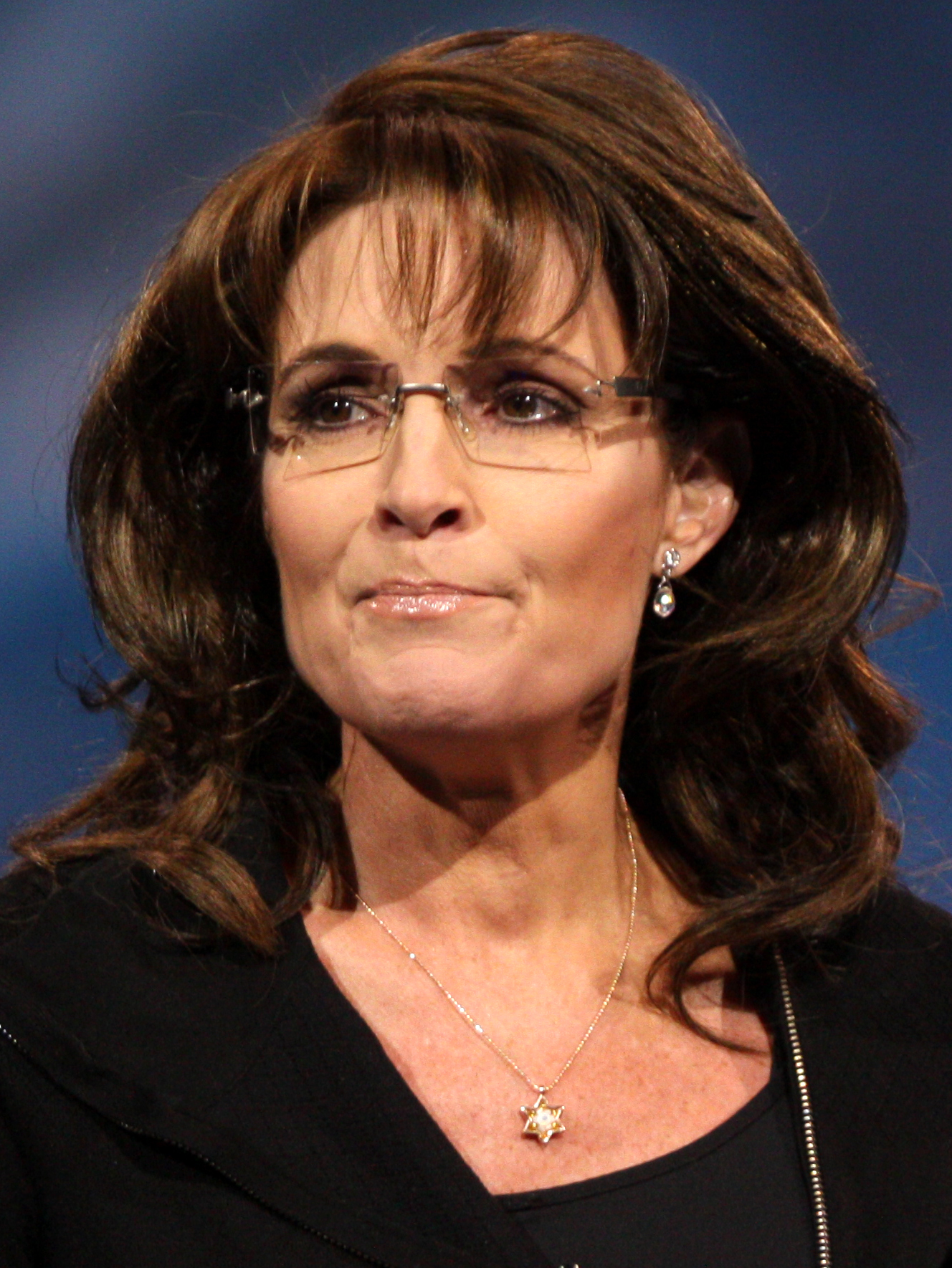
Sarah Palin
Former Governor
of Alaska

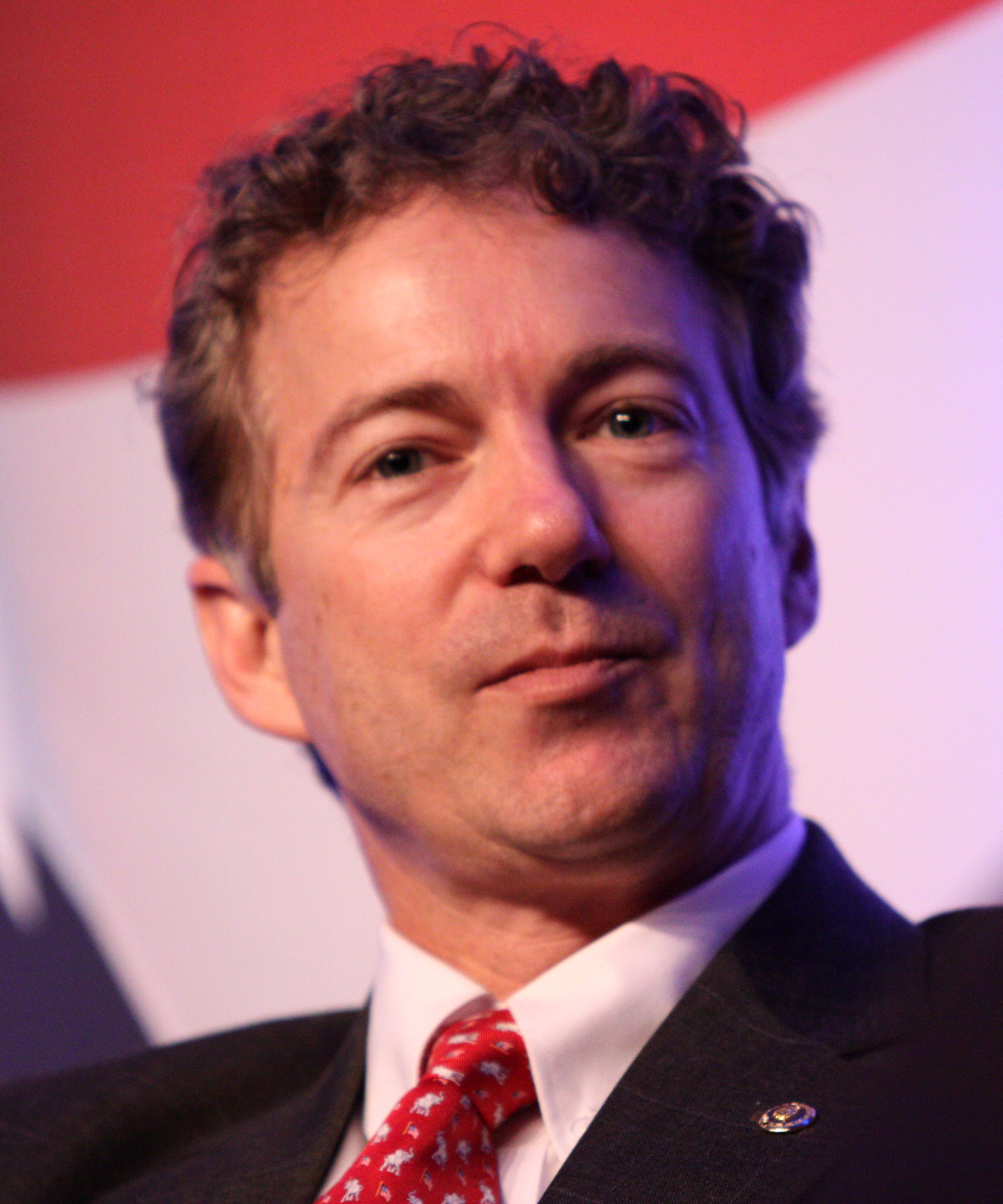
Rand Paul
U.S. Senator for Kentucky
Endorsed Ron Paul

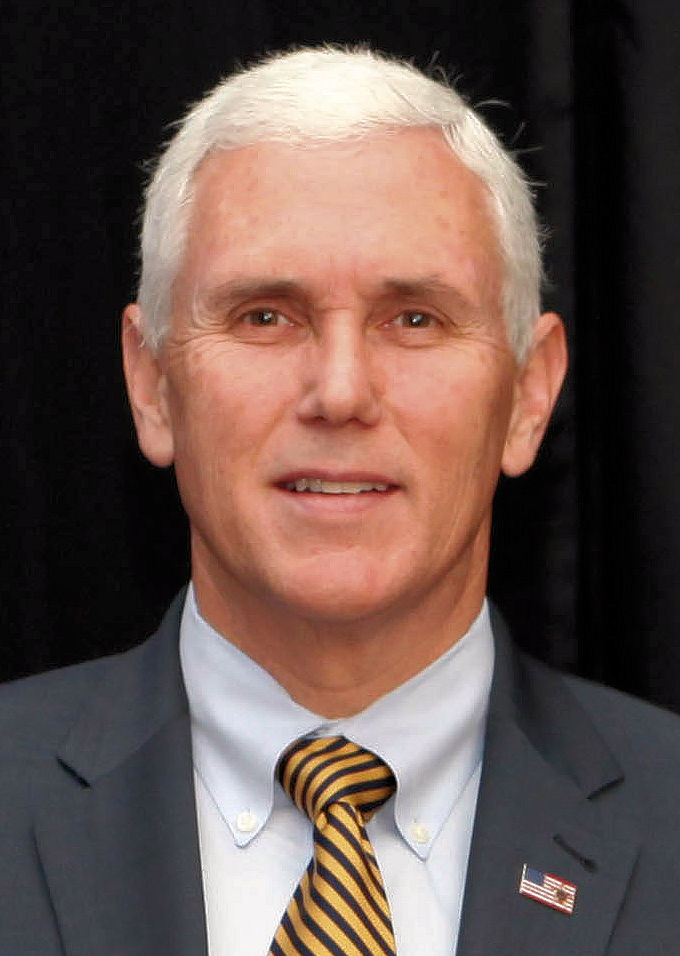
Mike Pence
U.S. Representative from Indiana Ran for governor

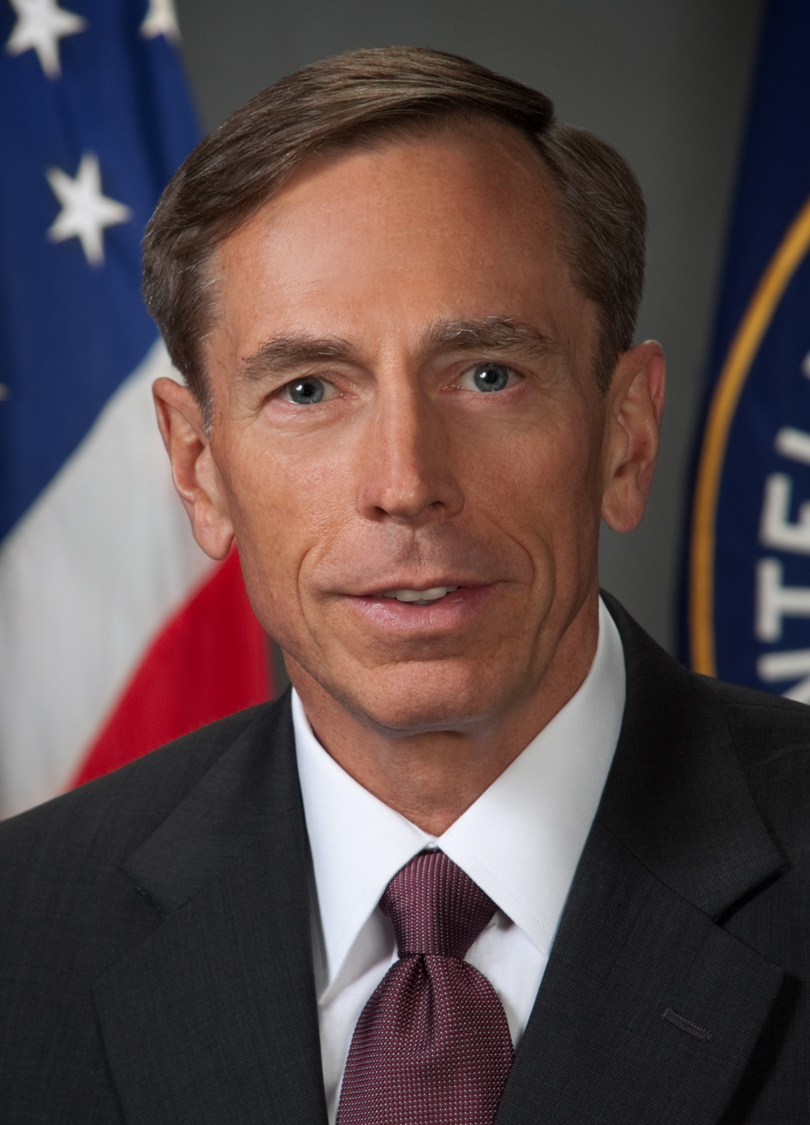
David Petraeus
Director of the Central Intelligence Agency from New York

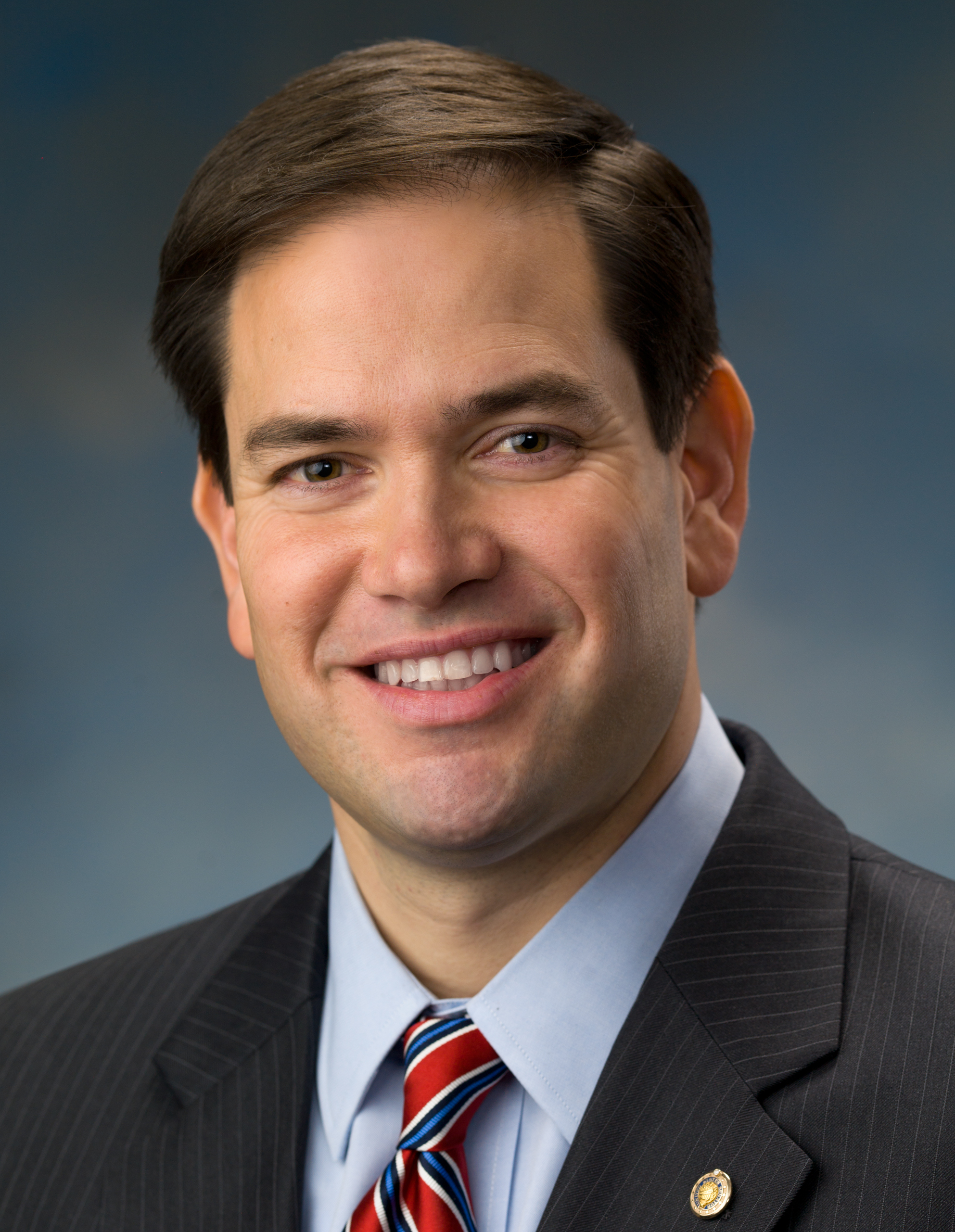
Marco Rubio
U.S. Senator for Florida
Endorsed Mitt Romney

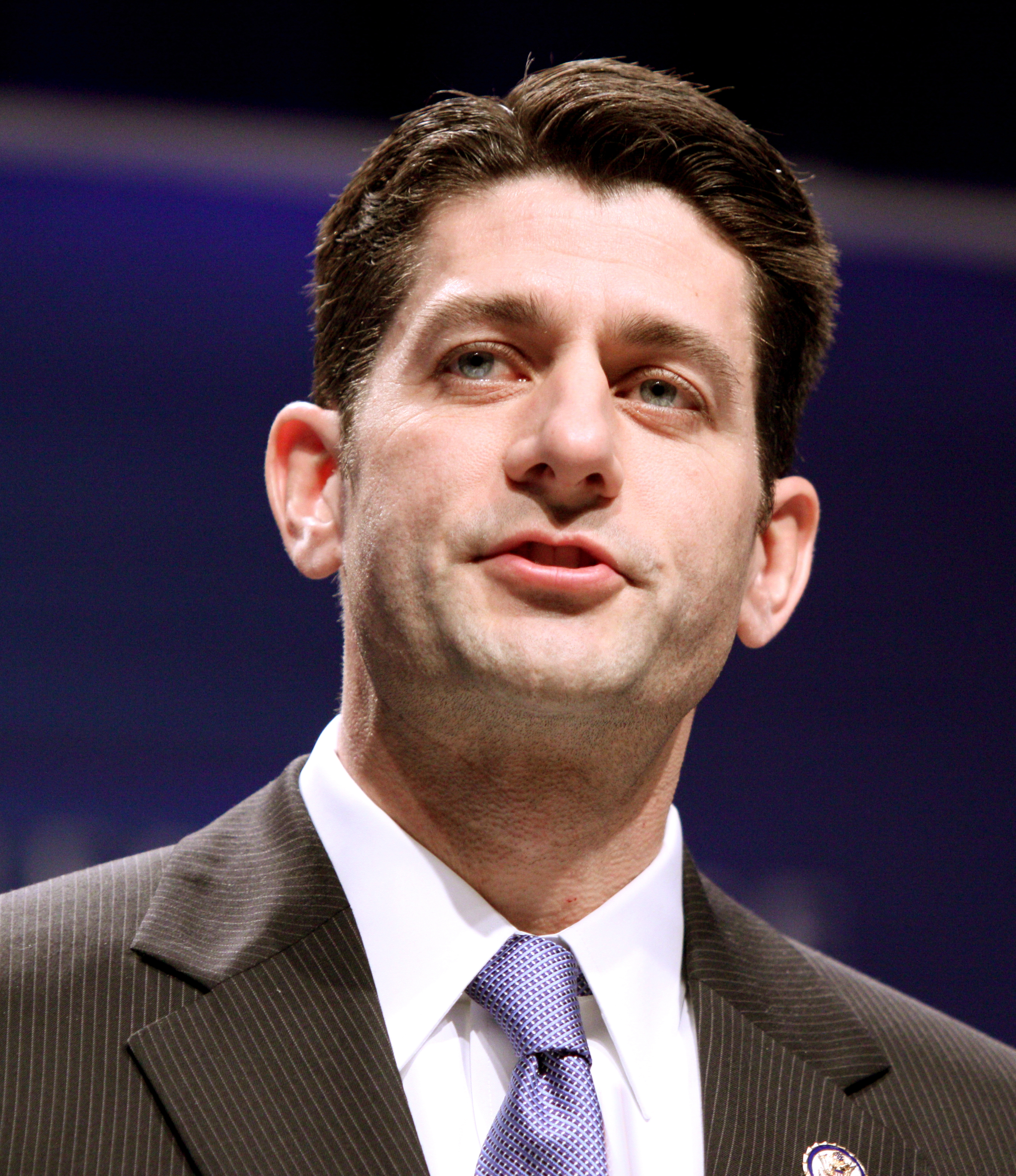
Paul Ryan
U.S. Representative from Wisconsin
Endorsed Mitt Romney;
Nominated for Vice President

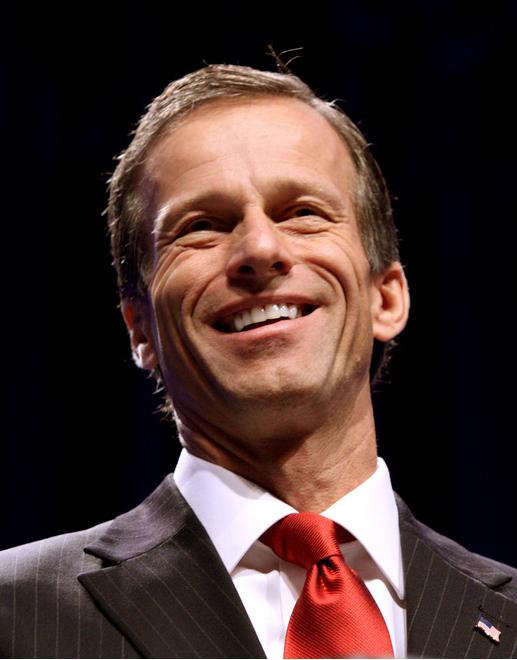
John Thune
U.S. Senator for South Dakota
Endorsed Mitt Romney

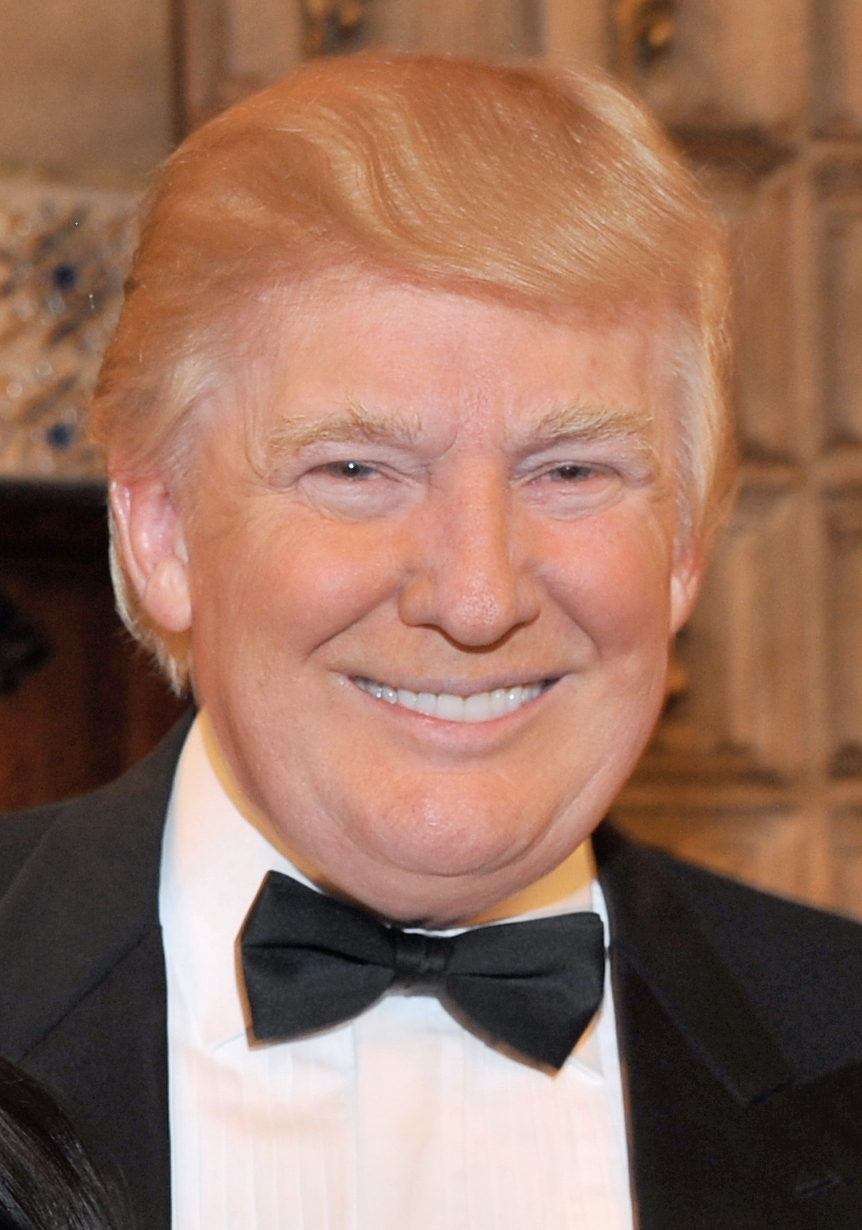
Donald Trump
Real estate developer and reality television personality from New York
Endorsed Mitt Romney

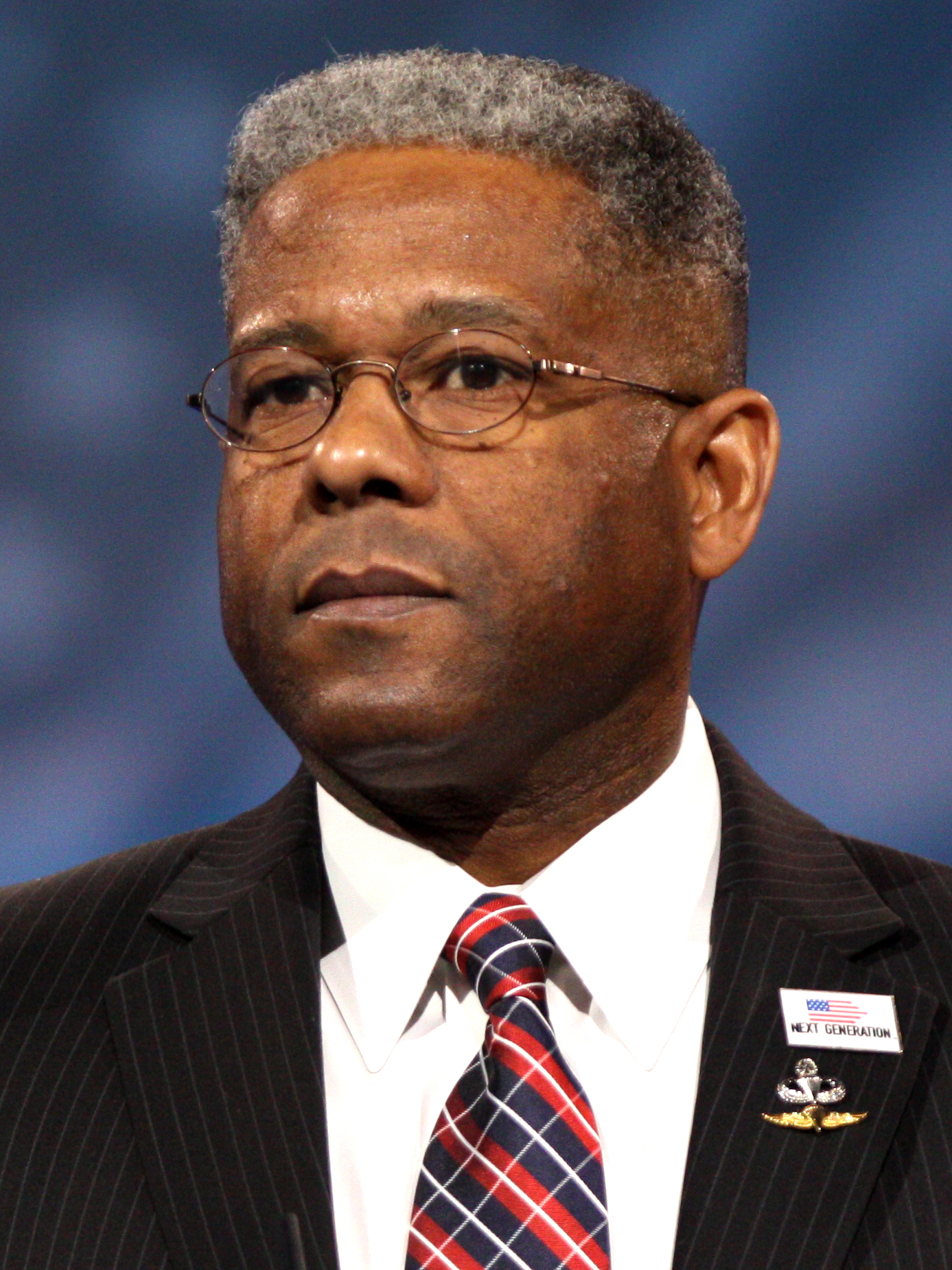
Allen West
U.S. Representative from Florida

== See also ==
- 2012 Republican Party presidential primaries
- Prelude to the 2012 Republican Party presidential primaries
- 2012 Republican Party presidential debates and forums
- Statewide opinion polling for the 2012 Republican Party presidential primaries
- 2012 Democratic Party presidential candidates
- Third party and independent candidates for the 2012 United States presidential election
- 2012 United States presidential election timeline
