= Lucie Silvas discography =

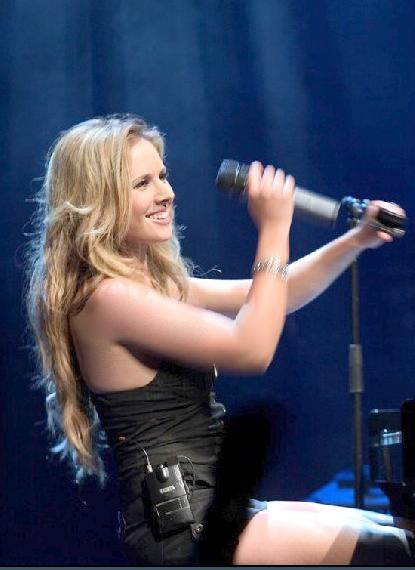
- Studio albums: 4
- Extended plays: 2
- Singles: 20
- Music videos: 13

The discography of the British singer-songwriter Lucie Silvas consists of four studio albums, two extended plays and twenty single releases.

Silvas debuted in 2000 with the song "It's Too Late", from the EP Forget Me Not; the single was not successful, charting at 62 in the UK music charts. Between this and the release of her next single, Silvas wrote songs for various other pop artists, including Gareth Gates and Rachel Stevens.

The release of "What You're Made of" in 2004 was her first successful single, charting at number 7 in the UK Official Top 40, and released in eight other countries. The release of her first studio album Breathe In met relative success, reaching platinum status in the UK where it reached number 11, and the Netherlands where it topped the charts at number one.

Her second studio album The Same Side was initially released in October 2006 in Netherlands and later released 12th March 2007 in the UK, charting at number 5 in the Netherlands but only managed 62 in the UK. "Last Year" was the first single in the UK and peaked at #79, and the second single "Sinking In" was a download only release on 5th March 2007 coupled with a non-album track "Coming Out Wrong", it failed to chart.

Silvas stated that she was taking a more laid back approach and did not feel the need to prove her vocal abilities.

In 2015, Silvas released her third full-length studio album, Letters to Ghosts.

== Albums ==
=== Studio albums ===
Title	Album details	Peak chart positions					Certifications
Title	Album details	UK	AUT	FR	NL	SP	Certifications
Breathe In	Released: 11 October 2004; Label: Mercury; Formats: CD, cassette, digital download	11	13	50	1	7	UK: Platinum; NL: Platinum; SP: Platinum
The Same Side	Released: 23 October 2006; Label: Mercury; Formats: CD, digital download	62	—	—	5	31	NL: Gold
Letters to Ghosts	Released: 18 September 2015; Label: Furthest Point; Formats: CD, digital download	—	—	—	—	—	
E.G.O.	Released: 24 August 2018; Label: Furthest Point; Formats: CD, digital download	—	—	—	—	—	

=== EPs ===
Title	Album details
Forget Me Not	Released: 2000; Label: Chrysalis; Formats: CD
Lucie Silvas	Released: 3 February 2015; Label: Furthest Point; Formats: Digital download

== Singles ==
Year	Single	Peak chart positions									Album
Year	Single	UK	AUT	BE	EU	GER	IRE	NL	SWE	SWI	Album
2000	"It's Too Late"	62	—	—	—	—	—	—	—	—	Forget Me Not
2004	"What You're Made of"	7	22	63	27	73	19	28	21	46	Breathe In
2005	"Breathe In"	6	—	—	39	86	34	41	—	—	Breathe In
2005	"The Game Is Won"	38	—	—	—	—	—	—	—	—	Breathe In
2005	"Don't Look Back"	34	—	—	—	—	48	—	—	—	Breathe In
2005	"Nothing Else Matters"	—	—	—	160	38	—	13	—	—	Breathe In
2005	"Forget Me Not"	76	—	—	—	—	—	48	—	—	Breathe In
2006	"Everytime I Think of You" (with Marco Borsato)	—	—	5	88	—	—	1	—	—	The Same Side
2006	"Last Year"	79	—	—	—	—	114	66	—	—	The Same Side
2007	"Sinking In"	—	—	—	—	—	—	—	—	—	The Same Side
2014	"Letters to Ghosts"	—	—	—	—	—	—	—	—	—	Letters to Ghosts
2014	"You Got It"	—	—	—	—	—	—	—	—	—	Letters to Ghosts
2015	"Villain"	—	—	—	—	—	—	—	—	—	Letters to Ghosts
2015	"Winter Wonderland"	—	—	—	—	—	—	—	—	—	—N/a
2016	"Find a Way" (feat. The Shadowboxers and John Osborne)	—	—	—	—	—	—	—	—	—	Letters to Ghosts
2017	"Smoke"	—	—	—	—	—	—	—	—	—	Letters to Ghosts
2018	"Kite"	—	—	—	—	—	—	—	—	—	E.G.O.
2019	"Black Jeans"	—	—	—	—	—	—	—	—	—	E.G.O.
2021	"Home Truths"	—	—	—	—	—	—	—	—	—	Non-album singles
2021	"Cool Down" (feat. Sheryl Crow)	—	—	—	—	—	—	—	—	—	Non-album singles
2021	"We Don't Know We're Living" (with Brandi Carlile & Joy Oladokun)	—	—	—	—	—	—	—	—	—	Non-album singles
2023	"A Dream is a Wish Your Heart Makes"	—	—	—	—	—	—	—	—	—	Non-album singles
"—" denotes single that did not chart or was not released

=== Guest singles ===
Year	Single	Peak chart positions						Album
Year	Single	AUT	BE	EU	FR	GER	SWI	Album
2006	"Même Si (What You're Made of)" (Grégory Lemarchal and Lucie Silvas)	—	11	21	2	—	26	Olympia 06
2006	"The Only Ones" (Reamonn featuring Lucie Silvas)	26	—	96	—	23	37	Wish
"—" denotes single that did not chart or was not released

== Music videos ==
Year	Song	Director(s)
2004	"What You're Made of"	
2005	"Breathe In"	
2005	"The Game Is Won"	
2005	"Don't Look Back"	
2005	"Nothing Else Matters"	
2005	"Forget Me Not"	
2006	"Même Si (What You're Made of)" (with Grégory Lemarchal)	
2006	"The Only Ones" (with Reamonn)	
2006	"Last Year"	
2007	"Sinking In"	
2015	"Letters to Ghosts"	Patrick Tohill
2015	"Villain"	
2015	"Perfect"	Talain Rayne

== Other contributions ==
Year	Song	Album
2005	"One Less Bell to Answer"	Live Pop Masters: Tribute to Burt Bacharach, Vol. 2
2009	"A Woman Should"	Natalie Williams Presents: Soul Family, Volume One
2010	"Both Sides Now" (Tommy Fleming featuring Lucie Silvas)	Going Back
2011	"Lean on Me"	Songs to Save a Life
2014	"Little Civil War" (Dave Barnes featuring Lucie Silvas)	Golden Days

== Writing credits ==
The following songs were co-written by Silvas, and performed by other artists.

Year	Song	Artist	Album/single
2002	"It Ain't Obvious"	Gareth Gates	What My Heart Wants to Say
2002	"Bittersweet"	S Club	Seeing Double
2003	"Jumpin"	Liberty X	Being Somebody
2003	"Take Me Home"	Liberty X	Being Somebody
2003	"I Just Wanna"	Liberty X	Being Somebody
2003	"I Got the Money"	Rachel Stevens	Funky Dory
2003	"Silk"	Rachel Stevens	Funky Dory
2004	"I'll Never Know"	Michelle McManus	The Meaning of Love
2004	"Sombras"	Natalia	Natalia
2004	"Shoulda Thought of That"	Rachel Stevens	"More, More, More"
2004	"Spin That Bottle"	Rachel Stevens	"Some Girls"
2006	"Who Am I"	Will Young	Keep On
2010	"It's Not Right"	Katharine McPhee	Unbroken
2010	"How"	Katharine McPhee	Unbroken
2010	"Faultline"	Katharine McPhee	Unbroken
2011	"Last Call"	The Saturdays	On Your Radar
2012	"Free"	Haley Reinhart	Listen Up!
2013	"Heart Shaped Wreckage"	Katharine McPhee and Jeremy Jordan	The Music of Smash: The Complete Season 2
2013	"Don't Let Me Know"	Katharine McPhee and Jeremy Jordan	The Music of Smash: The Complete Season 2
2013	"Pretender"	Katharine McPhee	The Music of Smash: The Complete Season 2
2013	"Calling Out My Name"	Jeremy Jordan, Krysta Rodriguez and Andy Mientus	Hit List (musical)
2013	"Somebody Else's Life"	The Saturdays	Living for the Weekend
2016	"Smoking Jacket"	Miranda Lambert	The Weight of These Wings
2017	"Hallelujah, Amen"	Reba McEntire	Sing It Now: Songs of Faith & Hope
2019	"Find a Way"	Trisha Yearwood	Every Girl
2019	"Tell Me Something I Don't Know"	Trisha Yearwood and Kelly Clarkson	Every Girl
2019	"What Gave Me Away"	Trisha Yearwood and Garth Brooks	Every Girl
