= Grégory Lemarchal discography =

- Studio albums: 2
- Live albums: 2
- Compilation albums: 2
- Singles: 9
- No.1 Singles: 1

The discography of Grégory Lemarchal, a French pop rock singer, comprises two studio albums, two live albums, one compilation album, and nine singles. After winning the fourth season of Star Academy France in 2004, Lemarchal released his debut studio album, Je deviens moi (2005) on Mercury Records, which peaked at number one in France. In 2006 Lemarchal released Olympia 06, which was recorded live at the Olympia music hall in Paris. In 2007, following Lemarchal's death due to cystic fibrosis, two albums were released posthumously, his second studio album La Voix d'un ange, and his second live album, Les Pas d'un ange. The single "De temps en temps" reached number one on the Syndicat National de l'Édition Phonographique chart in France following Lemarchal's death. The year 2009 saw the release of the compilation album Rêves, comprising all singles released by Lemarchal, including additional tracks.

== Albums ==
Title	Details	Peak chart positions			Certifications
Title	Details	FRA	BEL (WA)	SWI	Certifications
Je deviens moi	Release date: April 17, 2005; Label: Mercury Records; Formats: CD, music download; First studio album	1	2	20	
Olympia 06	Release date: October 23, 2006; Label: Mercury Records; Formats: CD/DVD, music download; First Live album/DVD	4	9	42	
La Voix d'un ange	Release date: June 18, 2007; Label: Mercury Records; Formats: CD, music download; Second studio album (posthumous)	1	1	6	
Les Pas d'un ange	Release date: December 3, 2007; Label: Mercury Records; Formats: CD/DVD; Second live album/DVD (posthumous)	14	6	—	
Rêves	Release date: November 2009; Label: Mercury Records; Formats: CD; First compilation album (posthumous)	1^{[A]}	5	49	FRA: 2× Platinum
Cinq ans	Release date: November 19, 2012; Label: Mercury Records; Formats: CD; Second compilation album (posthumous)	9	4	—	
"—" denotes releases that did not chart or were not released to that country

== Singles ==
Year	Title	Chart			Album
Year	Title	FRA	BEL (WA)	SWI	Album
2005	"Écris l'histoire"	2	2	18	Je deviens moi
2005	"Je suis en vie"	17	12	40	Je deviens moi
2005	"À Corps perdu"	—	14^{[B]}	—	Je deviens moi
2006	"Même si (What You're Made of)" with Lucie Silvas	2	11	26	single only
2006	"Le Feu sur les planches"	—	—	—	Je deviens moi
2007	"SOS d'un terrien en détresse"	141	—	28	La Voix d'un ange
2007	"De temps en temps"	1	1	10	La Voix d'un ange
2007	"Le Lien"	—	23	—	La Voix d'un ange
2008	"Restons amis"	9	29	—	La Voix d'un ange
"—" denotes releases that did not chart or were not released to that country

== Other charted songs ==
Year	Title	Chart	Album
Year	Title	BEL (WA)	Album
2009	"Je rêve"	9^{[B]}	Rêves

== Notes ==
- A This position came from the French compilation chart.
- B These positions come from the Ultratip chart.
