= Forget me not (disambiguation) =

Forget-me-not refers to any member of the flowering plant genus Myosotis.

The name is sometimes applied to other members of the family Boraginaceae, such as the Chinese forget-me-not (Cynoglossum amabile).

Forget me not may also refer to:

== Film ==
- Forget Me Not (1917 film), an American silent drama film starring Kitty Gordon
- Forget Me Not (1922 film), an American silent melodrama film
- Forget Me Not (1935 film), a German drama film
- Forget Me Not (1936 film), a British musical drama film
- Forget Me Not (2009 film), an American horror film
- Forget Me Not (2010 British film), a British romance film
- Forget Me Not (2010 Japanese film), a Japanese film
- Forget Me Not (2024 film), a Bangladeshi drama film
- Forget Me Not, a short film by Federico Castelluccio

== Literature ==
- Forget-Me-Nots: Poems to Learn by Heart, a 2012 children's poetry collection
- Forget Me Not, a 2021 novel by Alexandra Oliva

== Television ==
- Forget Me Not (TV series), a Malaysian television series

=== Episodes ===
- "Forget Me...Not" (Charmed)
- "Forget Me Not" (Doctors)
- "Forget-Me-Not" (Family Guy)
- "Forget Me Not" (Knight Rider)
- "Forget Me Not" (Once Upon a Time in Wonderland)
- "Forget Me Not" (Psych)
- "Forget Me Not", fourth episode of Star Trek: Discovery (season 3)
- "Forget Me Not" (Ruby Gloom)

== Music ==
=== Albums ===
- Forget Me Not (Dark Lunacy album), 2003
- Forget Me Not (EP), by Lucie Silvas, 2000

=== Songs ===
- "Forget Me Not" (Lucie Silvas song), 2000
  - this song was re-recorded in 2005.
- "Forget Me Not" (Martha and the Vandellas song), 1968
- "Forget Me Not" (Vera Lynn song), 1952
- "Forget Me Not", by Bad English from their eponymous album, 1989
- "Forget Me Not", by Bonnie Pink from Evil & Flowers, 1998
- "Forget Me Not", by Celine Dion from One Heart, 2003
- "Forget Me Not", by Enhypen from the single "Border: Hakanai", 2021
- "Forget-Me-Not", by Laufey from A Matter of Time, 2025
- "Forget-me-not", by Reona from Sword Art Online: Alicization, 2019
- "Forget Me Not", by Roy Harper, 1975
- "Forget Me Nots", by Patrice Rushen, 1982

== Other ==
- Forget-Me-Not (annual), a yearbook published in 1822
- Forget-Me-Not (video game), a 2011 game
- Forget-Me-Not (wooden canal boat), moored at Ashton-under-Lyne, England
- Forget-me-not stitch in crochet
- Catochrysops strabo, an Asian butterfly
- Forget-Me-Not (mechanical computer), built by Rowland Emett
- ForgetMeNot (Xabi), a Marvel Comics character
