= Breathe In =

Breathe In may refer to:

- Breathe In (Lucie Silvas album), 2004
  - "Breathe In" (song), a 2005 song by Lucie Silvas
- "Breathe In", by Low Roar from 0, 2014
- Breathe In (Phillips, Craig and Dean album), 2012
- Breathe In (film), a 2013 film by Drake Doremus
