= The Same Side =

Studio album by Lucie Silvas
- Released: 20 October 2006
- Recorded: 2006
- Genre: Pop
- Length: 44:39 (Standard release); 47:56 (UK bonus track release); 55:57 (Bonus CD)
- Label: Mercury
- Producer: Danton Supple

Lucie Silvas chronology
Breathe In (2004)	The Same Side (2006)	Letters to Ghosts (2015)

Alternative covers
- Dutch Cover

Singles from The Same Side
- 1. "Everytime I Think of You" Released: 2 October 2006; 2. "Last Year" Released: 6 November 2006; 3. "Sinking In" Released: 5 March 2007

Professional ratings
Review scores
Source	Rating
Allmusic	3/5 stars

The Same Side is the second album by the British singer-songwriter Lucie Silvas. It was first released on 20 October 2006 in the Netherlands. It was scheduled for release at the same time in Silvas' native UK, but was postponed after the album's first single "Last Year" rose only to number 79 in the UK. The album was released in the UK on 12 March 2007. The album debuted in the Dutch Albums Chart at number 5, though only peaked at 62 in the UK.

== Album information ==
The Dutch edition of the album includes the song "Everytime I Think of You", a duet with Dutch singer Marco Borsato, as the 12th track of the album with "Stolen" as a hidden track.

== Singles ==
"Everytime I Think of You" was released as the first single in the Netherlands. It charted within the Dutch Top 40 at number 35 on downloads only, before rising to Number 1 the following week.

The first UK single (and second single for the Netherlands) was "Last Year". It failed to reach the UK Top 100, prompting Silvas' record company to postpone the UK release of the album for several months.

A second single, "Sinking In", was released as a 'download only' single in the UK.

== Track listing ==
No.	Title	Writer(s)	Length
1.	"Last Year"	Lucie Silvas, Judie Tzuke, Charlie Russell, Graham Kearns	4:06
2.	"Sinking In"	Silvas, Cheryl Parker, Kearns	3:53
3.	"The Same Side"	Silvas, Tzuke, Kearns	4:18
4.	"Trying Not to Lose"	Silvas, Richard Lobb	2:53
5.	"Something About You"	Silvas, Jon Green, Lobb	3:51
6.	"Place to Hide"	Silvas, Tzuke, Kearns	3:45
7.	"Almost" (UK bonus track)	Silvas, Tzuke, Russell, Kearns	3:17
8.	"Right Here"	Silvas, Russell, Kearns	4:12
9.	"Counting"	Silvas, Lobb	3:14
10.	"Already Gone"	Silvas, Green, Dennis Mcouski, Russell	4:06
11.	"Alone"	Silvas, Kearns, Parker, Russell	3:48
12.	"Passionate You"	Silvas, Dan Wilson	3:24
13.	"Stolen" (Hidden track)	Silvas, Green, Lobb	3:01

Dutch edition
No.	Title	Writer(s)	Length
1.	"Last Year"	Silvas, Tzuke, Russell, Kearns	4:06
2.	"Sinking In"	Silvas, Parker, Kearns	3:53
3.	"The Same Side"	Silvas, Tzuke, Kearns	4:18
4.	"Trying Not to Lose"	Silvas, Lobb	2:53
5.	"Something About You"	Silvas, Green, Lobb	3:51
6.	"Place to Hide"	Silvas, Tzuke, Kearns	3:45
7.	"Right Here"	Silvas, Russell, Kearns	4:12
8.	"Counting"	Silvas, Lobb	3:14
9.	"Already Gone"	Silvas, Green, Mcouski, Russell	4:06
10.	"Alone"	Silvas, Kearns, Parker, Russell	3:48
11.	"Passionate You"	Silvas, Wilson	3:24
12.	"Everytime I Think of You" (with Marco Borsato)	Jack Conrad, Ray Kennedy	4:05
13.	"Stolen" (Hidden track)	Silvas, Green, Lobb	3:01

Dutch limited edition bonus disc
No.	Title	Writer(s)	Length
1.	"Breathe In" (Live, Denmark)	Silvas, Tzuke, Kearns, Peden	3:31
2.	"What You're Made of" (Live, Whitfield Street)	Silvas, Gordeno, Peden	4:16
3.	"Twisting the Chain" (Acoustic version)	Silvas, Tzuke, Russell, Kearns, Peden	3:53
4.	"Forget Me Not" (Live)	Silvas, New	3:09
5.	"The Longer We're Apart" (Live)	Silvas, Parker	8:28

== Personnel ==
- Lucie Silvas – vocals, backing vocals (1–5, 7, 8, 11, 12), acoustic piano (1, 3, 7, 10, 13)
- Jon Green – Wurlitzer electric piano (1, 2, 8, 10, 12), Hammond organ (1, 2, 5, 7, 8, 10, 12), backing vocals (1, 3, 5, 8, 11, 12), keyboards (2, 5, 9, 11), acoustic piano (5, 8, 9, 11)
- Graham Kearns – guitars (1–3, 5–8, 10–12)
- Ben Epstein – bass (1–3, 5, 7, 8, 10–12)
- Dave Tench – Moog bass (11), additional keyboards (12), sonic wizardry (12)
- Tom Meadows – drums (1–5, 7, 8, 10–12), percussion (1, 2, 5, 8, 9, 11, 12)
- Ian Burdge – cello (4, 10, 12)
- Nick Etwell – trumpet (9, 12)
- Richard Lobb – backing vocals (1, 3–5, 11), guitars (4, 9)
- Laura Wilson – backing vocals (1, 11)
- Mia Silvas – backing vocals (3, 7, 8, 12)

== B-sides ==
Title	Single(s)
"Morning to a Child"	"Last Year"
"Coming Out Wrong"	"Sinking In"

== Chart performance ==
Chart (2006)	Providers	Peak position	Certification	Sales
Dutch Mega Albums Chart	MegaCharts BV	5	Gold	35,000
Spanish Albums Chart	Promusicae	31	-	-
Official UK Albums Chart	BPI	62	-	-
