= Rêves (album) =

Compilation album by Grégory Lemarchal
- Released: November 16, 2009
- Recorded: France
- Genre: Pop
- Label: Mercury

Grégory Lemarchal chronology
Les Pas d'un ange (2007)	Rêves (2009)

Singles from Rêves
- 1. "Je rêve" Released: 2009

Rêves is a posthumous compilation recorded by French singer Grégory Lemarchal. It was released in November 2009 and contains all his previous singles and some cover versions of various artists, including Céline Dion and Daniel Balavoine, and two unpublished songs, the first two tracks of the album (although Olivier Ottin, the former manager of the singer, had earlier said in an interview with the Nouvel Observateur that the album would be fully composed of unpublished songs). "Je rêve" is also the first song written by Lemarchal.

According to Universal Music website, some rights and benefits from the album's sales will be donated to Grégory Lemarchal association to fight against cystic fibrosis. The first single off the album will be "Je rêve" and its music video will be composed of images from a documentary entitled À l'ouest d'un souffle nouveau and funded by Lemarchal association. The song features six former patients who had the chance to receive a transplant.

The album debuted at number one on the French Compilations Chart on 22 November 2009 with 37,563 units sold.

== Track listing ==
1. "Tu prends" – 3:26
2. "Je rêve" – 3:55
3. "Écris l'histoire" (Francesco de Benedittis, Paul Manners, David Esposito) – 4:12
4. "Mieux qu'ici bas" – 3:53
5. "De temps en temps" (Davide Esposito, Grégory Lemarchal) – 3:54
6. "Je suis en vie" (Alana Filippi, Rémi Lacroix) – 3:42
7. "SOS d'un terrien en détresse" (Michel Berger, Luc Plamondon) – 3:23
8. "Même si" featuring Lucie Silvas (Lucie Silvas, Peter Gordeno, Mike Peden) – 3:48
9. "Entre nous" – 3:20
10. "Le feu sur les planches" (Eleonor Coquelin, Laurent Mesambret) – 4:13
11. "Restons amis" (Esposito, Rémi Lacroix, Isabelle Bernal) – 3:29
12. "Je t'écris" (Yvan Cassar, Marc Lévy) – 6:40
13. "À corps perdu" (Alexandre Lessertisseur, R. Jericho, V. Filho) – 4:09
14. "Zora sourit" – 3:41
15. "Le lien" (Patrick Fiori, Julie Zenatti) – 3:32
16. "Quand on n'a que l'amour" – 3:22

== Charts and sales ==
=== Weekly charts ===
Chart (2009)	Peak position
Belgian (Wallonia) Albums Chart	3
French SNEP Compilations Chart	1
Swiss Albums Chart	49

=== Year-end charts ===
End of year chart (2009)	Position
Belgian (Wallonia) Albums Chart	82
End of year chart (2010)	Position
Belgian (Wallonia) Albums Chart	32

=== Certifications ===
Certifications for Rêves
Region	Certification	Certified units/sales
Belgium (BRMA)	Gold	15,000^{*}
France (SNEP)	2× Platinum	200,000^{*}
^{*} Sales figures based on certification alone.
