= Last Year (disambiguation) =

"Last Year" is a 2006 song by Lucie Silvas.

Last Year may also refer to:

- Last Year, a 2018 video game
- Last Year, a song by alt-J from the 2017 album Relaxer

== Other uses ==
- The Last Year, a 1951 German drama film

== See also ==
- Next Year (disambiguation)
- This Year (disambiguation)
