= Letters to Ghosts =

Studio album by Lucie Silvas
- Released: 18 September 2015
- Studio: Sound Emporium Studios, The Casino, Hill Studios and Neale Dalgren's Studio (Nashville, Tennessee, USA); Sarm Hook End and The Manor Studio (Oxfordshire, UK)
- Genre: Americana, Roots Pop, Country
- Length: 44:28
- Label: Furthest Point/Universal, Decca Records
- Producer: Lucie Silvas; Ian Fitchuk; John Osborne; Charlie Russell; Brad Spence

Lucie Silvas chronology
The Same Side (2006)	Letters to Ghosts (2015)	E.G.O. (2018)

Singles from Letters to Ghosts
- 1. "Letters To Ghosts" Released: 24 July 2015; 2. "Villain" Released: 24 July 2015; 3. "Smoke" Released: 25 January 2017

Letters to Ghosts is the third studio album by British singer-songwriter Lucie Silvas. It was released on 18 September 2015 through Silvas' own record label, Furthest Point, via Caroline records and later released by Decca Records in 2016 following Silvas' signing with them.

It is the first album by Silvas since 2006 and signifies a musical change from the pop/adult contemporary of her previous releases to a more country/roots style following her move from the UK to Nashville, Tennessee.

The track "Find A Way" was subsequently recorded by Trisha Yearwood for her 2019 album Every Girl. Silvas provided backing vocals on Yearwood"s version.

== Track listing ==
Letters To Ghosts
No.	Title	Writer(s)	Length
1.	"Letters To Ghosts"	Lucie Silvas, Jon Green	3:27
2.	"Smoke"	Silvas, Julian Emery, Jim Irvin	4:25
3.	"Find A Way"	Silvas, Emery	3:16
4.	"Roots"	Silvas, Jamie Floyd	5:11
5.	"Unbreakable Us"	Silvas, Floyd, Jabe Beyer	3:53
6.	"How To Lose It All"	Silvas, Beyer, Ian Fitchuk	3:18
7.	"Shame"	Silvas, Beyer	3:43
8.	"Pull The Stars Down"	Silvas, Green, Fitchuk	3:52
9.	"Villain"	Silvas, Dave Barnes, Maren Morris	3:35
10.	"Happy"	Silvas, Graham Kearns, Judie Tzuke	4:36
11.	"You Got It"	Jeff Lynne, Tom Petty, Roy Orbison	5:32
Total length:			44:28

== Personnel ==
Credits adapted from AllMusic.

Musicians and Vocals

- Lucie Silvas – lead vocals, mandolin (1), additional vocals (1), acoustic piano (9), programming (9)
- Ian Fitchuk – keyboards (1–3, 5–8), percussion (1, 4–8), drums (2–5, 7, 8), acoustic piano (11)
- Charlie Russell – additional programming (10)
- Jon Green – acoustic guitar (1, 2, 4), backing vocals (1), keyboards (2–4, 10), additional vocals (2, 4)
- John Osborne – acoustic guitar (1, 6), guitars (1–8, 11), mandolin (1, 5, 8), additional vocals (1, 11), bass (4, 8), mandola (7)
- Kyle Ryan – acoustic guitar (7, 8)
- Johnny Duke – additional guitars (7)
- Graham Kearns – guitars (10)
- Adam Gardner – bass (1, 6)
- Samuel Dixon – bass (2, 3)
- Butterfly Boucher – bass (5, 7)
- Paul Turner – bass (10)
- Fred Eltringham – drums (1, 6)
- Ash Soan – drums (10)
- David Angell – strings (2)
- David Davidson – strings (2)
- Carole Rabinowitz – strings (2)
- Kristin Wilkinson – strings (2)
- Zach Casebolt – strings (4)
- Cassie Shudak – strings (4)
- Lindsey Smith-Trostle – strings (4)
- Katelyn Westergard – strings (4)
- Jordan Lehning – string arrangements and composing (2, 4)
- Jabe Beyer – additional vocals (2, 5, 7, 11), acoustic guitar (5, 7)
- Natalie Hemby – additional vocals (2)
- Kate York – additional vocals (8)

Production and Technical

- Jay Kay – executive producer (10)
- Lucie Silvas – producer
- Ian Fitchuk – producer (1–8, 11)
- John Osborne – producer (1–8, 11)
- Charlie Russell – producer (10), mixing (10)
- Brad Spence – producer (10), mixing (10)
- F. Reid Shippen – recording (1, 5–8), mixing (1–9)
- Eric Masse – recording (2–4)
- Brad Hill – overdubbing (1–4, 6), recording (11), mixing (11)
- Paul Cossette – recording assistant (1, 5–8)
- Daniel Bacigalupi – mix assistant (1–9)
- Dave McNair – mastering at Dave McNair Mastering (Winston-Salem, North Carolina)
- Roi Hernandez – art direction, design
- Sonya Jasinski – photography
- Jon Leshay – management

== Release history ==
List of regions, release dates, formats, label and references
Region	Date	Format(s)	Label	Ref.
Worldwide	18 September 2015	CD; digital download	Furthest Point Records	
Worldwide	2 September 2016	CD; digital download	Decca Records	
