= The Game Is Won =

2005 single by Lucie Silvas

- CD1

Single by Lucie Silvas

from the album Breathe In
- B-side: "Sliding Down"
- Released: 2 May 2005
- Studio: Studio 360
- Length: 4:00
- Label: Mercury
- Songwriters: Lucie Silvas, Judie Tzuke, Graham Kearns, Mike Peden
- Producer: Mike Peden

Lucie Silvas singles chronology
"Breathe In" (2005)	"The Game Is Won" (2005)	"Don't Look Back" (2005)

Alternative covers
- CD2

"The Game Is Won" is a song by English singer-songwriter Lucie Silvas. It was released as the third single from her debut studio album, Breathe In (2004). The song was released on 2 May 2005 and reached number 38 on the UK Singles Chart.

== Track listings ==
UK CD1
No.	Title	Writer(s)	Length
1.	"The Game Is Won"	Lucie Silvas, Judie Tzuke, Graham Kearns, Mike Peden
2.	"The Longer We're Apart" (live on Parkison)	Silvas, Cheryl Parker

UK CD2
No.	Title	Writer(s)	Length
1.	"The Game Is Won"	Silvas, Tzuke, Kearns, Peden
2.	"Sliding Down"	Silvas, Richard Lobb
3.	"What You're Made Of" (live)	Silvas, Peter Gordeno, Peden

== Credits and personnel ==
Credits are lifted from the UK CD1 liner notes.

Studios

- Recorded at Studio 360
- Strings recorded at Abbey Road Studios (London, England)
- Mixed at Quad Studios (New York City)

Personnel

- Lucie Silvas – writing, vocals, background vocals, piano
- Judie Tzuke – writing
- Graham Kearns – writing, guitars
- Mike Peden – writing, production
- Mia Silvas – background vocals
- Paul Turner – bass
- Peter Gordeno – keyboards
- Charlie Russell – drums, drum programming
- Martin Hayles – recording
- Dan Gautreau – recording assistance
- Gary Thomas – recording (strings)
- Michael H. Brauer – mixing
- Keith Gary – mixing assistance, Pro Tools engineering
- Nick Ingman – string arrangement, conducting
- Gavyn Wright – concertmaster
- Isobel Griffiths – orchestra contracting

== Charts ==
Chart (2005)	Peak position
Scottish Singles Sales (Official Charts)	30
UK Singles (Official Charts)	38
