= Olympia 06 =

Live album by Grégory Lemarchal
- Released: October 23, 2006
- Recorded: France
- Genre: Pop
- Label: Universal, Mercury

Grégory Lemarchal chronology
Je deviens moi (2005)	Olympia 06 (2006)	La Voix d'un ange (2007)

Olympia 06 is the name of the only live album recorded by the French singer Grégory Lemarchal. It was recorded during the only series of concerts given by the artist at the Olympia of Paris in 2006 in order to support his debut album Je deviens moi, and was released on October 23, 2006. It contains a cover version of Lucie Silvas' song "What You're Made of", recorded in live version as a duet with her, and another version with Nolwenn Leroy.

The album met success in France and in Belgium (Wallonia), particularly the DVD which was charted again just after the singer's death, topping the French Videos Chart on the chart edition of May 5, 2007. This DVD is currently still charted.

== Formats and track listing ==
CD album

#	Title	Length
1	"Intro"	1:34
2	"Je deviens moi"	3:30
3	"Je suis en vie"	3:39
4	"Mon Ange"	3:50
5	"Promets-moi"	3:29
6	"Il n'y a qu'un pas"	3:52
7	"Aussi libre que moi"	4:59
8	"Même si (What You're Made of)" duet with Lucie Silvas	3:44
9	"À corps perdu"	4:05
10	"Fais-moi un signe"	3:33
11	"Le Feu sur les planches"	3:54
12	"Nos fiançailles"	3:58
13	"Pardonne-moi"	4:23
14	"Show Must Go on"	4:00
15	"Écris l'histoire"	4:21
16	"Je t'écris"	6:42
17	"Même si (What You're Made of)" duet with Nolwenn Leroy	3:44

Digital download

DVD

The DVD contains the same track listing.

== Charts ==
=== CD ===
Chart (2006)	Peak position
Belgian (Wallonia) Albums Chart	9
French Albums Chart	4
Swiss Albums Chart	42
Chart (2007–2008)	Peak position
French Digital Chart	4

End of the year chart (2007)	Position
Belgian (Wallonia) Albums Chart	41
French Albums Chart	43

=== DVD ===
Chart (2006)	Peak position
Belgian (Wallonia) Musical DVD Chart	1
French Musical DVD Chart	7
Chart (2007–2008)	Peak position
French Musical DVD Chart	1

End of the year chart (2006)	Position
Belgian (Wallonia) Musical DVD Chart	50
End of the year chart (2007)	Position
Belgian (Wallonia) Musical DVD Chart	4
French Videos Chart	2
