= Je suis en vie =

Je suis en vie may refer to

- Je suis en vie (album)", 2015 album by Akhenaton
- "Je suis en vie" (song), song by Grégory Lemarchal from his 2005 album Je deviens moi
