= Jungle Cruise (soundtrack) =

Jungle Cruise (Original Motion Picture Soundtrack)

Soundtrack album by James Newton Howard
- Released: July 30, 2021
- Recorded: 2020–2021
- Genre: Film score
- Length: 1:12:43
- Label: Walt Disney Records
- Producer: James Newton Howard

James Newton Howard chronology
Raya and the Last Dragon (2021)	Jungle Cruise (2021)	Fantastic Beasts: The Secrets of Dumbledore (2022)

Jungle Cruise (Original Motion Picture Soundtrack) is the soundtrack album to the 2021 film Jungle Cruise, featuring original score composed by James Newton Howard. In addition to the score, a re-written film version of "Nothing Else Matters" performed by Metallica, from their 1991 studio album Black Album, was featured in the film and in the soundtrack. It was released on July 30, 2021, along with the soundtrack album distributed by Walt Disney Records. The score was recorded at Sony Scoring Stage in February 2020 and concluded in late-2021, despite sessions being halted due to COVID-19 pandemic lockdown. Los Angeles Master Chorale choir also provided vocals for the track. The score received positive response, with praise directed towards Howard's composition, ethnic instrumentation and orchestral sounding.

== Development ==
In January 2019, it was announced that James Newton Howard joined the production as the film score composer. The score was recorded in February 2020 by a 99-person orchestra, with vocals provided by 40 members from the Los Angeles Master Chorale. At that time, it was the last film score to be recorded at the Sony Scoring Stage in Culver City, California, which was temporarily shut down in March 2020, due to the COVID-19 pandemic lockdown, and sessions resumed in late-2021, when restrictions were lifted, but with limited members at the studio. In order to add a "regional flavor", Howard incorporated panpipes and Brazilian percussion instruments. Howard said "It has a wonderful retro feel, like an adventure movie from the 1940s, so it was immensely gratifying". Several themes were produced for the characters and situations in the film, that needed an ethnic and instrumental touch.

By August 2020, it was revealed that Metallica collaborated with Howard on an instrumental version of the song "Nothing Else Matters", for the film. According to the band's drummer Lars Ulrich, Metallica worked on the film after Walt Disney Pictures president Sean Bailey felt like Jungle Cruise was "the right fit" for a collaboration between Disney and Metallica. Bailey had been "always looking for the right match where there was a way that Metallica could contribute to some Disney project". They began re-writing the orchestral version of the track by September 2020, while the band members recorded their parts from their individual studios, due to the COVID-19 pandemic. Frequent Metallica collaborator Greg Fidelman served as associate producer and engineer. The film version of "Nothing Else Matters" was released on July 30, along with the film's soundtrack.

Howard came up with several temp tracks for the score, that lasted for 145 minutes, which were demos of his previously edited music. Speaking to Rogerebert.com, he said "It's twice the amount of work, of course, because if they change the scene, or if they want you to redo it, you have to redo the whole demo. There's a lot of work there."

== Track listing ==
No.	Title	Length
1.	"Jungle Cruise Suite"	8:20
2.	"Nothing Else Matters – Jungle Cruise Version Part 1" (performed by Metallica)	1:26
3.	"Breaking Into the Archives"	4:02
4.	"Stop Her!"	2:33
5.	"A Steamer to Brazil"	1:56
6.	"Jungle Cruise"	1:53
7.	"Nilo"	1:18
8.	"Frank Breaks In"	1:12
9.	"Preparing to Set Sail"	2:53
10.	"Market Chase"	2:45
11.	"Sub Attack"	2:14
12.	"Encantado"	1:18
13.	"The Rapids"	3:42
14.	"Lily Snoops"	2:29
15.	"Trader Sam"	1:24
16.	"The Tree Fight"	5:56
17.	"Lily Finds Frank"	1:17
18.	"Joachim and the Bees"	1:10
19.	"Nothing Else Matters – Jungle Cruise Version Part 2" (performed by Metallica)	4:29
20.	"I Built a Boat"	2:00
21.	"La Luna Rota"	1:24
22.	"Underwater Puzzle"	4:35
23.	"Petal Negotiations"	3:43
24.	"Conquistadors Arrive"	2:38
25.	"One Last Cruise"	1:19
26.	"I Want You to Rest Now"	3:46
27.	"Absolutely Exhausting"	1:00
Total length:		72:43

== Reception ==
Zanobard reviews gave a score of 8/10 and summarised "James Newton Howard's roaring, adventurous score for Jungle Cruise is quite simply outstanding. The orchestral style is exquisitely rich, incredibly well-crafted and very reminiscent of those classic '80s action adventure movies that we all love dearly, not to mention being an absolute joy to listen to pretty much from start to finish. The main theme then takes this style and just runs with it; the motif itself is memorable, versatile and as dashingly heroic as you could possibly hope for, and the way it and the orchestra go seamlessly hand-in-hand is pretty much the highlight of the score." James Southall of Movie Wave wrote "The album is too long and needs cutting back for the score to be fully-appreciated... It's refreshing to hear a modern blockbuster like this filled with carefully-honed action music and not just the usual ostinato-based approach, and even if overall I think it's perhaps a shade behind Raya and the Last Dragon in this composer's 2021 releases, it's still a highly entertaining piece of work. The recording is a bit strange – extremely wet, it doesn't really showcase the intricate orchestration as it might – but that doesn't stop me enjoying it."

Soundtrack World wrote "The album does... contain many short tracks with that reactive style of music. You can hear some excellent implementations of the themes, but sometimes, especially during some of the action scenes, the reactive music overstays its welcome a bit, if you just want to listen to the music without seeing the movie... James Newton Howard has written a wonderful score. It is rare that the soundtrack for an action movie is fully orchestral, and as a bonus has many amazing theme integrations." Jonathan Broxton wrote, "Jungle Cruise is a tremendous score, enjoyable and engaging and full of highlights. The thematic density of the score is seriously impressive, with the two recurring main themes and the love theme standing out especially. The action music is brilliant – complex, interesting from both a rhythmic and orchestration point of view, and standing easily alongside some of Howard's recent best – and the emotional apex of the score in the Tears of the Moon sequence is stunningly beautiful."

Loudwire-based Chad Chiders praised the film version of Metallica's "Nothing Else Matters" as being different from the original version featured on Black Album (1991). He wrote, "This new version sounds a little more fleshed out with symphonic elements, with legendary film composer James Newton Howard putting his fresh touch on the 1991 classic."

== Charts ==
Chart (2021)	Peak position
US Soundtrack Albums (Billboard)	23

== Personnel ==
Credits adapted from Allmusic

- Isobel Anthony – choir conductor
- Freddy Avis – music programming
- Belinda Broughton – orchestra supervision
- George Doering – guitar
- Tyler Durham – music programming
- Greg Fidelman – associate producer, recording engineer
- James Hetfield – composer, songwriter ("Nothing Else Matters")
- James Newton Howard – composer
- Los Angeles Master Chorale – choir
- Metallica – primary artist ("Nothing Else Matters")
- Shawn Murphy – audio mixing, recording
- David Olson – score editing
- Xander Rodzinski – music programming
- John Traunwieser– recording engineer
- Lars Ulrich – composer, songwriter ("Nothing Else Matters")
- Jim Weidman – score editing
