= The Shadowboxers =

American pop group

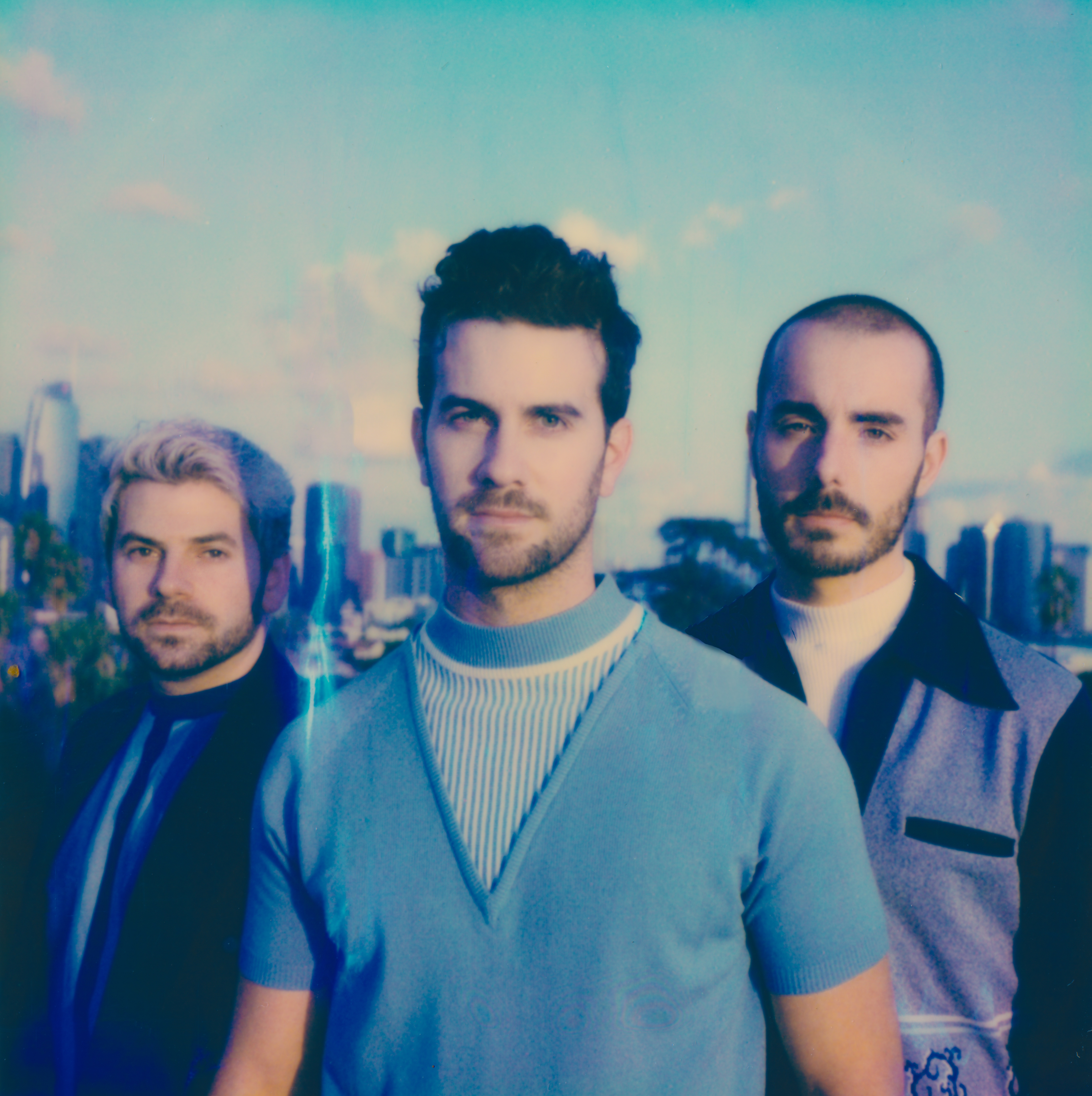

Background information
- Origin: Atlanta, Georgia
- Genres: Pop, Soul, R&B
- Years active: 2008–present
- Members: Scott Tyler; Adam Hoffman; Matt Lipkins; Carlos Enamorado
- Past members: Cole Mcsween; Nick Rosen; Jamie Reilly; Jaron Pearlman; Ben Williams
- Website: www.theshadowboxers.com

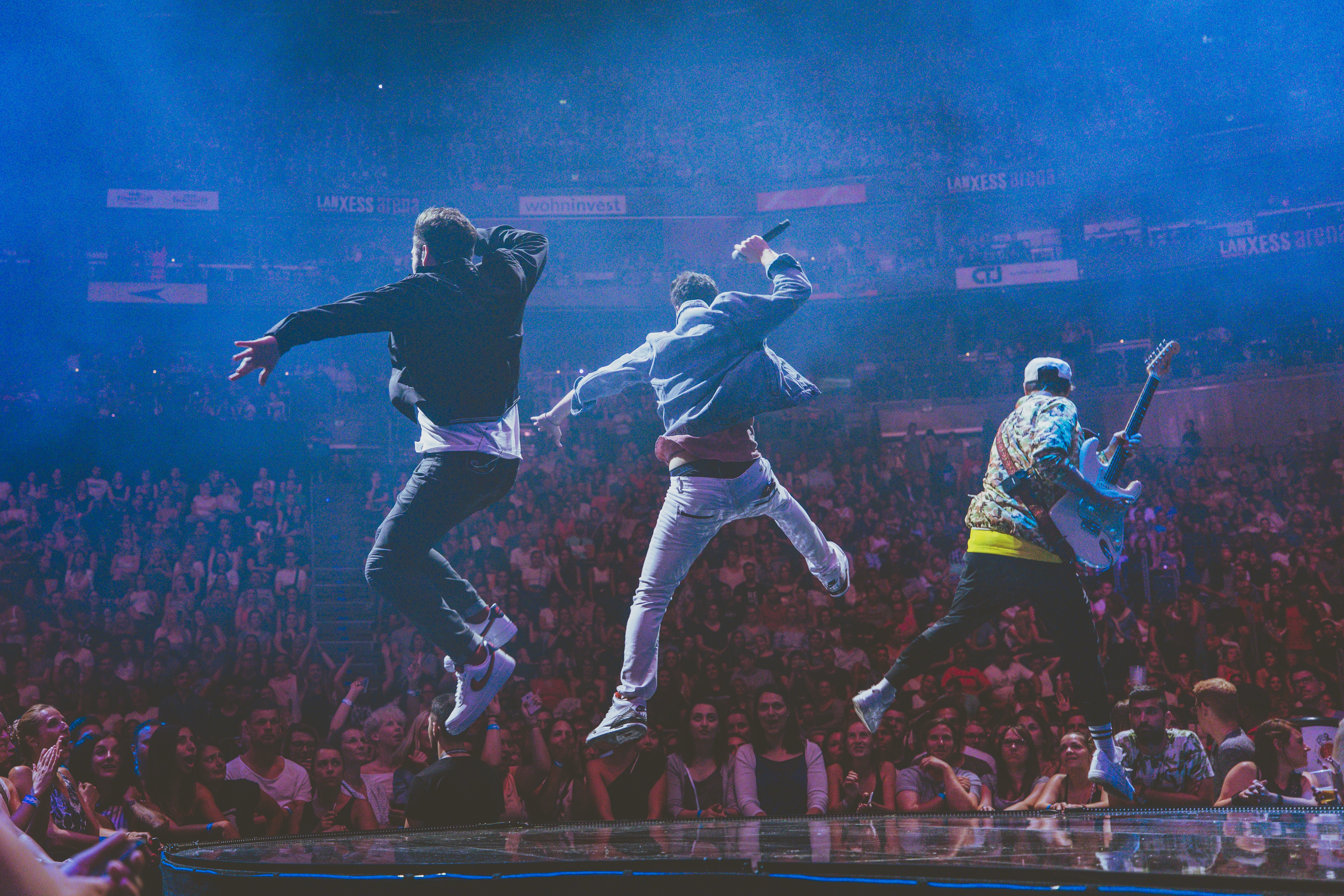
The Shadowboxers leap during their performance on Justin Timberlake's MOTW Tour

The Shadowboxers is a pop band formed in Atlanta, Georgia. The founding members —Scott Tyler (vocals, guitars), Adam Hoffman (vocals, guitars), and Matt Lipkins (vocals, keyboards)—met at Emory University in 2008.

== History ==
=== Formation ===
The band began at Emory University where Scott Tyler (from Nashville, Tennessee), Adam Hoffman (from Cedar Rapids, Iowa) and Matt Lipkins (from Larchmont, New York) met during their freshmen year in 2007.

=== Band name ===
Hoffman, Lipkins and Tyler decided on the group's name in 2009. The term "shadowboxer" can be defined as someone who makes the motions of attack or defense, and for the band it represents rhythm and method. The group is rhythmically driven, describing their sound as anything "soul". Their music is composed of substance, layers of tempos and harmonies.

=== Indigo Girls ===
The band was writing extensively, booking shows around Atlanta, and honing their sound. In 2010, Tyler met Emily Saliers, one half of the Atlanta-based Indigo Girls at a Passover Seder. The two began talking about music and Saliers asked to hear him play. Tyler picked up a guitar and played her some of his original material with The Shadowboxers. Saliers recalls saying when she heard Tyler sing, "I just remember being stunned by it." The following week, Saliers attended a performance by the band. One year later, the band went on tour with the Indigo Girls, serving as their backing band and opening act for over two years.

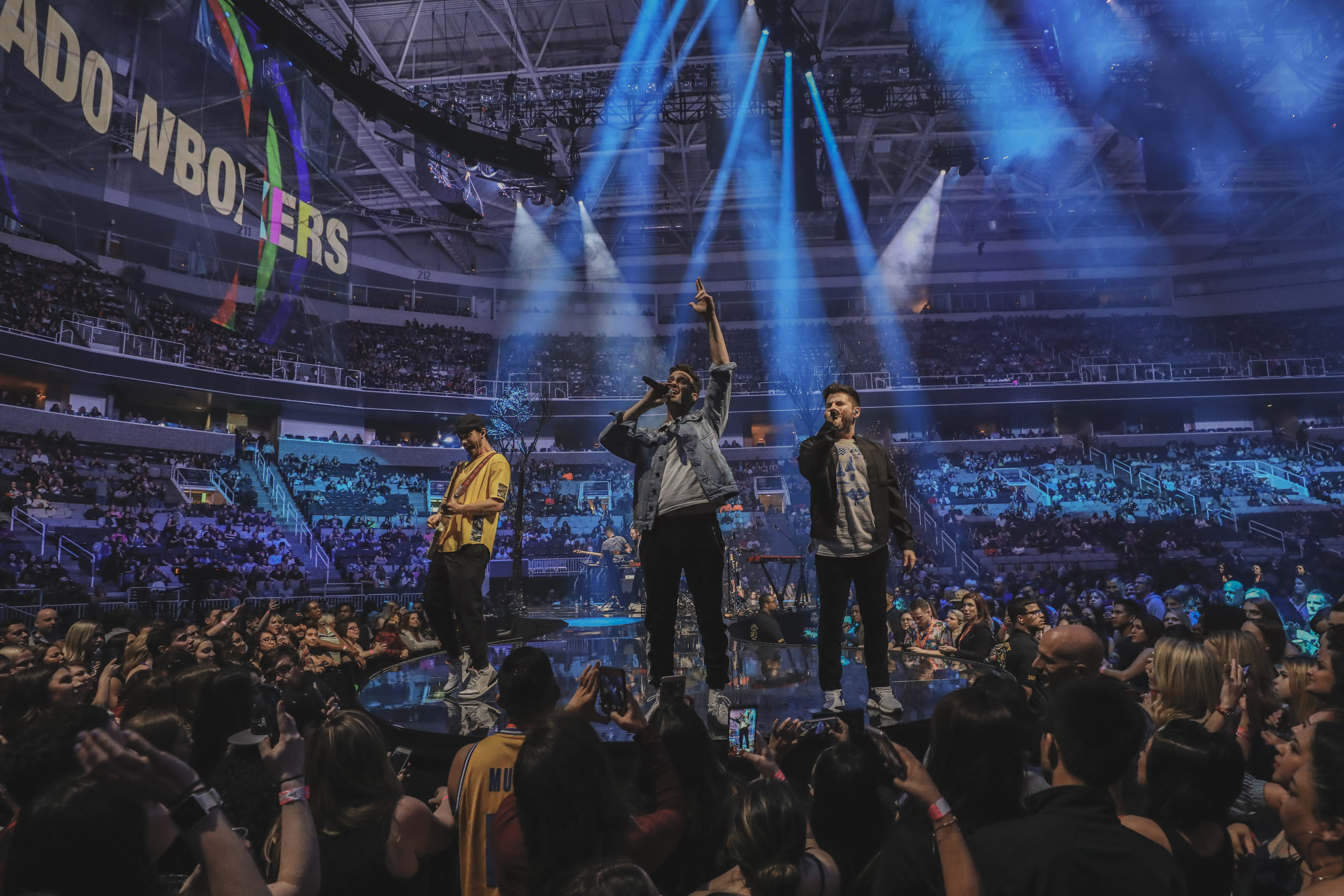
The Shadowboxers performing on Justin Timberlake's Man of the Woods Tour

=== Justin Timberlake ===
On December 3, 2013, Hoffman tweeted to Justin Timberlake from the band's Twitter account, telling him he needed to check out their cover of his song "Pusher Love Girl". It caught his attention and Timberlake posted a tweet about the video. The trio met with Timberlake a couple of weeks later during his 20/20 Tour and he offered to mentor them and help them shape their sound. Later, he signed them to his artist development label, Villa 40, and in June 2017, the band joined Justin Timberlake and K-Kov at a studio in New York to record new music.

In 2018, The Shadowboxers were asked to join Timberlake on his Man of the Woods tour, as openers from March 13, 2018 - January 29, 2019.

== Music ==
=== Self-titled EP ===
In 2011, the band released a self-titled EP produced by Shawn Grove, Dan Hannon, Will Mitchell, and the band. It includes six recorded songs and two live songs, recorded at Eddie's Attic.

=== Red Room ===
From February 14 – March 30, 2012, the band ran a Kickstarter campaign to fund their first full-length album. They raised over $32,000 (of a $18,000 goal), and recorded various cover songs on their YouTube channel to thank financial backers of the project.

The money went to studio time with producer Brady Blade, and engineer Chris Bell as well as the addition of the horn section Grooveline Horns to some of their new songs. The 14 track album was released by Vanguard Records and Welk Music Group on January 22, 2013. Two weeks later, Red Room was named as a top music pick from the New York Daily News.

=== Apollo EP ===
The Shadowboxers released an EP of original works titled Apollo on March 23, 2018. Included are previously released singles "Hot Damn!" and “Runaway" and features the focus track, “Timezone,” which debuted on Spotify's New Music Friday playlist.

=== Singles ===
==== Woman Through The Wall ====
On May 5, 2016, the band released the single "Woman Through The Wall", which was co-written by Gabe Simon from Kopecky. A sequential video was released on June 6, 2016.

==== Build The Beat ====
The single "Build the Beat" was released on August 12, 2016, and currently has over 2.6 million streams on Spotify. This song features Rashawn Ross on horns. The song charted on Spotify's Global Viral 50 and United States Viral 50 playlists.

==== Hot Damn! ====
Recorded at The Loft Studios in New York City, the single "Hot Damn" was co-produced by Timberlake and K-Kov. It was released on September 22, 2017, and was featured on Spotify's United States Viral Top 50 playlist. According to the band, the track was the first song the band recorded that captured the energy of their live show.

==== Runaway ====
On January 16, 2018, the band released the single "Runaway" produced by The Shadowboxers, Timberlake and Rob Knox. It was performed live on The Today Show and The Talk and placed on Spotify's United States Viral Top 50 playlist.

==== Stop ====
On July 26, 2018, The Shadowboxers released "Stop" while in Hamburg, Germany on the Man of the Woods Tour.

==== Finding A Problem ====
On August 9, 2018, the band released the single "Finding A Problem," a personal song about the "recognition in yourself that maybe it's you not committing fully to something as opposed to everyone else."

==== Telephone ====
“Telephone,” an ode to the Bee Gees seminal 1977 music video “How Deep Is Your Love” and co-written by Justin Timberlake, drips in nostalgia, from the band's embroidered satin jackets to their recreation of the Bee Gee's iconic back-to-back-to-back shot. For “Telephone," The Shadowboxers (Matt Lipkins, Scott Tyler and Adam Hoffman) were inspired by the schoolyard game of the same name, where word travels from person to person, but is never quite the same as when it started. The single was released on October 11, 2018.

==== Runaway Acoustic ====
The acoustic version of the song "Runaway" by The Shadowboxers was released on November 15, 2018.

==== Timezone Acoustic ====
The acoustic version of the song "Timezone" by The Shadowboxers was released on November 15, 2018.

==== Last Summer ====
The Shadowboxers wrote the title track for the Netflix feature film, "The Last Summer" starring KJ Apa. The film premieres May 3.

==== In The Dark ====
"In The Dark" was released on October 25, 2019.

==== Honeymoon ====
The Shadowboxers wrote "Honeymoon" in the winter of 2017 with their friend Adrianne “AG” Gonzalez, while breaking from session after session of writing upbeat pop songs. The song was released on December 6, 2019. The title, “Honeymoon” was something Matt brought in, and in trying to work out a song around the word itself, he and AG thought it'd be interesting to write a deceptively romantic sounding sad ballad. “Honeymoon” represents a lot of elements of The Shadowboxers identity that they haven't showcased in years.

==== Won't Ever Say Goodbye ====
"Won't Ever Say Goodbye" was released exclusively via Billboard on January 22, 2020, and the single released worldwide on January 23, 2020. "The song lived in our heads and in our DropBox for a long time, but we kept coming back to it. The task of finally going into the studio to record it felt pretty daunting. Demo-itis is a real thing. But what we came out with really felt more honest and more uniquely 'us,'" The Shadowboxers tells Billboard. "From a production standpoint, this song is really hard to classify. It somehow feels fast and slow at the same time. It exists in this sort of slinky in-between space which helps you feel the dichotomy of the intense resolve of the song combined with a kind of subconscious melancholy." The track features a groovy guitar cutting into razor-sharp pop vocals, as the group sings about not letting go of a significant other, divine echoing harmonies cooing in the background. It's a coincidental feeling for the group to be singing about, considering they're letting go of their sonic past to create this new chapter for themselves where they exhibit more creative control.

==== Something To Hold ====
In September 2021, The Shadowboxers released a neo-soul single "Something To Hold".

== Members ==
=== Current lineup ===
- Scott Tyler – vocals, guitar (2008–present)
- Adam Hoffman – vocals, guitar (2008–present)
- Matt Lipkins – vocals, keyboards (2008–present)
- Carlos Enamorado – bass guitar (2013–present)

=== Former members ===
- Cole McSween – drums (2013–2018)
- Nick Rosen - keyboards (2016 - 2018)
- Jamie Reilly – drums (2008–2010)
- Jaron Pearlman – drums (2010–2012)
- Benjamin Ryan Williams – bass (2010–2013)

== Discography ==
=== Albums ===
- The Shadowboxers (2011)
- Red Room (2013)
- Apollo (2018)
- The Slow March Of Time Flies By (2020)

=== Other contributions ===
- Dave Barnes - Dreaming in Electric Blue (Reimagined) (2020) / Vocals
- The Last Summer (film) - Last Summer (2019) / Co-writers / Producers / Vocals
- David Ryan Harris - One Thought Away (2018) / Background Vocals
- Hunter Hayes - You Should Be Loved (2017) / Background Vocals
- Clark Beckham - Must Be Hard Being You (2017) / Co-Writers
- The Book of Love (film) - The Book of Love (2016) / Vocals
- Thomas Rhett - Tangled Up (2015) - "Tangled" / Co-Writers
- Lucie Silvas - Find A Way (2015) / Vocals
- Indigo Girls – Beauty Queen Sister (2011) – “Beauty Queen Sister” and “We Get To Feel It All” / Background Vocals
- Daytrotter: The Shadowboxers (2013) / Vocals & Writers
- NoiseTrade Exclusive: The Shadowboxers (2013) / Vocals & Writers
