= Raya and the Last Dragon (soundtrack) =

Raya and the Last Dragon (Original Motion Picture Soundtrack)

Soundtrack album by James Newton Howard
- Released: February 26, 2021
- Recorded: 2020–2021
- Studios: Sony Scoring Stage (score); Studio 1 at Abbey Road, London (choir)
- Genre: Film score
- Length: 1:09:51
- Label: Walt Disney Records
- Producer: James Newton Howard

James Newton Howard chronology
| News of the World (2020) | Raya and the Last Dragon (2021) | Jungle Cruise (2021) |

Singles from Raya and the Last Dragon (Original Motion Picture Soundtrack)
- 1. "Lead the Way" Released: February 26, 2021

Raya and the Last Dragon (Original Motion Picture Soundtrack) is the soundtrack album to the 2021 animated film Raya and the Last Dragon. The film score was composed by James Newton Howard, scoring a Disney animated film for the first time in 19 years since Treasure Planet (2002). The album features 24 tracks and was released by Walt Disney Records on February 26, 2021. Jhené Aiko wrote and performed a song entitled "Lead the Way" for the end credits.

== Development ==
I think in animation, the great thing about it—and somebody else said this, not me—is that as a composer, you can do anything you want. You can really write the craziest, most fun, silly, exciting music that you can think of, and collaborating with these filmmakers, [including] Don Hall, was just so great. You feel like you're sitting around a real round table. I don't feel like a composer, off in an ivory tower. You really feel part of a team, and I had a blast. I think the movie is great, and I think the score is very different for me. It's at least 50% electronics, with lots of exotic sounds in there, and I think it's really fun.

— James Newton Howard, on scoring Raya and the Last Dragon.

James Newton Howard signed the project in November 2019, while he was also scoring for Paul Greengrass' News of the World (2020). Don Hall presented him storyboards, rough animation and character sketches, prior to his inclusion and Howard felt that "Somehow or another, you get used to it and you find yourself becoming moved by a couple of static drawings of the characters if the music is working". The score has a "non-specific South Asian feel, while also having a touch of Indonesian gamelan" as well as "instruments originated from China to Vietnam, though many of them sound similar".

The first theme he wrote for the film, was the main theme "Running on Raindrops". Howard also expressed about the difficulties he had on creating the 5-minute prologue as it was not only conveying the main themes, but also setting the tone. He used a Balinese jaw harp called genggong for the prologue theme. In addition, he also used various percussion instruments such as, skin drums, hand drums and rattles, a rarity in western music. Vocal harmonies were provided by New York-based singer Loire, who provided the war chants.

Due to the COVID-19 pandemic lockdown, film productions came into halt, delaying the scoring process. The recording began in October 2020 after the re-opening of Sony Scoring Stage, which was temporarily closed as a result of the lockdown restrictions. However, the capacity of the orchestra members were limited to 40 players per time, meaning that each of the musicians were doubled in the sound mixing to make the orchestra sound bigger than the initial recording. Alan Meyerson worked on the sound mixing. In some cases, Howard used samples his crew put together in the final mixing.

== Release ==
The score was released by Walt Disney Records on February 26, 2021, a week ahead of the film's release. It features 23 tracks from Howard's song, including "Lead the Way", a single performed by Jhené Aiko was featured in the end credits. The preview of the single was announced a week prior, on February 19, and the music video was released on March 4.

Filipino singer KZ Tandingan was hired as the performer of "Gabay" (Guide), Disney's first-ever Filipino-language song, in March 2021. The track, the Filipino version of "Lead the Way", would be part of the film's soundtrack for the Filipino dub of the film. Allie Benedicto, studio marketing head of Disney Philippines, said the song "demonstrates our commitment to work with local creative talents to tell our stories in a locally relevant manner". In a press release, Tandingan said she was grateful and proud to be singing in her native language as well as singing in a Disney film. She liked its messages of trust as well as coming together and uniting to change the world when feeling weak and alone.

A cover of "Lead My Way", performed by K-pop musician Hyojung was released on March 5, 2021.

== Track listing ==
| No. | Title | Length |
|---|---|---|
| 1. | "Lead the Way" (Jhené Aiko) | 3:43 |
| 2. | "Prologue" | 5:44 |
| 3. | "Young Raya and Namaari" | 3:26 |
| 4. | "Betrayed" | 4:34 |
| 5. | "Search for the Last Dragon" | 1:13 |
| 6. | "Into the Shipwreck" | 2:52 |
| 7. | "Enter the Dragon" | 0:52 |
| 8. | "Fleeing from Tail" | 1:22 |
| 9. | "Captain Boun" | 1:02 |
| 10. | "Journey to Talon" | 1:19 |
| 11. | "Sisu Swims" | 1:44 |
| 12. | "Dragon Graveyard" | 2:53 |
| 13. | "Escape from Talon" | 3:42 |
| 14. | "Noi and the Ongis" | 2:32 |
| 15. | "Being People Is Hard" | 4:05 |
| 16. | "Spine Showdown" | 3:26 |
| 17. | "Running on Raindrops" | 2:11 |
| 18. | "Plans of Attack" | 1:15 |
| 19. | "Brothers and Sisters" | 3:58 |
| 20. | "The Meeting" | 3:19 |
| 21. | "Storming Fang" | 4:09 |
| 22. | "The Druun Close In" | 2:58 |
| 23. | "Return" | 4:58 |
| 24. | "The New World" | 2:35 |

== Reception ==
Zanobard Reviews gave 6/10 to the score saying "James Newton Howard's Raya And The Last Dragon is a disappointingly forgetful affair; a score consisting of an intriguing and at points genuinely breathtaking orchestral style but sadly very little substance bar a short and simple main theme that makes few appearances on album." Music critic Alex Reif called the score as "masterful, delivering a score that is as varied as the film itself". James Southall of Movie Wave wrote "The score isn't as consistently full-bodied as Maleficent but it's probably Howard's most entertaining since then. The album undoubtedly doesn't present the music in its strongest light – a fair bit could be trimmed from the middle section for a better listening experience – but it's got good themes, exciting action music and as I said at the start, it doesn't sound like you would expect it to, which is not something you could often say about a major score by an A-list film composer as established as James Newton Howard is. It's a very entertaining score, positive and entertaining and it brings a smile to the face."

Jonathan Broxton wrote "Raya and the Last Dragon is a joy; while it never quite reaches the heights of Maleficent or the Fantastic Beasts films, it is nevertheless a score with a lot of heart and warmth, plenty of energy, mysticism, emotion, power and scope, which blends the synthetic and the acoustic together in a way that is interesting, appropriate, and captures the spirit of Raya's world." Anton Smit of Soundtrack World wrote: "When you listen to the soundtrack carefully, however, you can find many hidden gems in there, with the beautiful main theme and the big emotional orchestral pieces as prime examples." Filmtracks.com said "Aside from the composer's eclectic, worldly instrumental mish-mash, the mix of the score remains perhaps its biggest detriment, its soundscape sounding small in its orchestral portions and the synthetics punching you in the nose. Artistic risks were definitely taken here, and the rewards for the listener are frustratingly brief."

== Charts ==
| Chart (2021) | Peak position |
|---|---|
| UK Soundtrack Albums (OCC) | 44 |

== Awards and nominations ==
| Year | Award | Category | Recipients | Result | Ref. |
|---|---|---|---|---|---|
| 2021 | BMI Film & TV Awards | Theatrical Film | James Newton Howard | Won | |
| 2022 | Annie Awards | Best Music - Feature | James Newton Howard and Jhené Aiko | Nominated | |
| 2022 | Cinema Audio Society Awards | Cinema Audio Society Award for Outstanding Achievement in Sound Mixing for a Motion Picture – Animated | Paul McGrath (original dialogue mixer); David E. Fluhr, Gabriel Guy (re-recording mixers); Alan Meyerson(scoring mixer); Doc Kane (adr mixer); Scott Curtis (foley mixer) | Nominated | |
| 2022 | International Film Music Critics Association Awards | Film Composer of the Year | James Newton Howard | Won | |
| 2022 | International Film Music Critics Association Awards | Best Original Score for an Animated Film | James Newton Howard | Won | |
| 2022 | Motion Picture Sound Editors (MPSE) Golden Reel Awards | Outstanding Achievement in Sound Editing – Sound Effects, Foley, Dialogue and ADR for Animated Feature Film | Shannon Mills, Brad Semenoff MPSE, Nia Hansen, Samson Neslund, David C. Hughes, Cameron Barker, Chris Frazier, Steve Orlando, John Roesch MPSE, Shelley Roden MPSE, Jim Weidman, David Olson | Won | |

== Personnel ==
Credits adapted from Allmusic:

- Jonathan Allen – recording
- Isobel Anthony – vocals
- Jon Aschalew – programming
- David Channing– editing
- Loire Cotler – vocals
- Kendall Demarest – editing
- Bruce Dukov – orchestra leader
- Pedro Eustache – woodwinds
- Fisticuffs–producer, programming
- Earl Ghaffari – editing
- Tommy Holmes – editing
- James Newton Howard – composer, producer
- Sumudu Jayatilaka – vocals
- Julian-Quan Viet Le – producer
- London Voices – choir
- Marianna Mennitti – chorus
- Alan Meyerson – mixing
- Shawn Murphy – recording
- David Olson – editing
- Michael Dean Parsons – programming
- Tobin Pugash – programming
- Benjamin Robinson – editing
- Xander Rodzinski – producer
- Gregg Rominiecki – mixing, recording
- Gabriella Scalise – chorus
- John Traunwieser – sound engineer
- Jim Weidman – editing
