= This Year =

This Year may refer to:

- The current year, 2026
- "This Year", a song by the Mountain Goats from the 2005 album The Sunset Tree
- "This Year", a song by Christina Aguilera from the 2000 album My Kind of Christmas
- This Year (album), a 2023 album by Kristian Bush

== See also ==
- Last Year (disambiguation)
- Next Year (disambiguation)
