= La Voix d'un ange =

Studio album by Grégory Lemarchal
- Released: 18 June 2007
- Recorded: France
- Genre: Pop
- Labels: Universal, Mercury

Grégory Lemarchal chronology
Olympia 06 (2006)	La Voix d'un ange (2007)	'Les Pas d'un ange' (2007)

Singles from La Voix d'un ange
- 1. "De temps en temps" Released: 11 June 2007; 2. "Le Lien" Released: January 2008; 3. "Restons amis" Released: 28 April 2008

La Voix d'un ange (meaning The Voice of an Angel) is the name of the second studio album recorded by the French singer Grégory Lemarchal. It was released on 18 June 2007, about one month and a half after the singer's death. The album contains the hit singles "De temps en temps", "Le Lien" and "Restons amis". It was very successful in France, in Belgium (Wallonia) (#1 in both countries) and Switzerland.

The album is composed of Lemarchal's unpublished songs and several cover versions performed when he participated in the Star Academy 4.

== Track listing ==
1. "De temps en temps" (Davide Esposito, Grégory Lemarchal) — 3:54
2. "Restons amis" (Esposito, Rémi Lacroix, Isabelle Bernal) — 3:43
3. "Le Lien" (Patrick Fiori, Julie Zenatti) — 3:32
4. "Recevoir" (Alexandre Lessertisseur, R. Jericho, V. Filho) — 4:18
5. "Con te partirò" (Pierre Jaconelli, Julie D'Aimé) — 4:28
6. "Là-bas" (Jean-Jacques Goldman) — 4:28
7. "Envole-moi" (Goldman) — 4:10
8. "S.O.S. d'un terrien en détresse" (Michel Berger, Luc Plamondon) — 4:23
9. "The Show Must Go On" (Freddie Mercury, Brian May, Roger Taylor, John Deacon) — 3:56
10. "Même si" featuring Lucie Silvas (Lucie Silvas, Peter Gordeno, Mike Peden) — 3:57
11. "Et maintenant" (Pierre Delanoë, Gilbert Bécaud) — 4:16

== Charts ==
Chart (2007)	Peak position
Belgian (Wallonia) Albums Chart	1
French Digital Chart	1
French Albums Chart	1
Swiss Albums Chart	6

End of year chart (2007)	Position
Belgian (Wallonia) Albums Chart	3
French Digital Chart	17
French Albums Chart	3
End of year chart (2008)	Position
French Albums Chart	36

== Certifications ==
Certifications for La Voix d'un ange
Region	Certification	Certified units/sales
Belgium (BRMA)	Platinum	30,000^{*}
Switzerland (IFPI Switzerland)	Gold	15,000^{^}
^{*} Sales figures based on certification alone.^{^} Shipments figures based on certification alone.
