= Breathe In (Lucie Silvas album) =

Studio album by Lucie Silvas
- Released: 11 October 2004
- Recorded: 2003–2004
- Studio: Studio 360, Angel Recording Studios and Abbey Road Studios (London, UK); Quad Recording Studios (New York City, New York, USA)
- Genre: Pop, adult contemporary
- Length: 46:02
- Label: Mercury
- Producer: Michael Peden

Lucie Silvas chronology
Forget Me Not (2000)	Breathe In (2004)	The Same Side (2006)

Singles from Breathe In
- 1. "What You're Made Of" Released: 4 October 2004; 2. "Breathe In" Released: 17 January 2005; 3. "The Game Is Won" Released: 2 May 2005; 4. "Don't Look Back" Released: 25 July 2005; 5. "Nothing Else Matters" Released: 31 October 2005; 6. "Forget Me Not" Released: 19 December 2005

Professional ratings
Review scores
Source	Rating
The Guardian	2/5 stars

Breathe In is the debut studio album by the British pop singer-songwriter Lucie Silvas, released by Mercury Records on 11 October 2004 in the United Kingdom. It was released in the Netherlands on 29 March 2005 and worldwide in April 2006.

The majority of the album was co-written by Silvas with Graham Kearns and Judie Tzuke whom Silvas had previously been a backing singer for. The album also features a cover of Metallica's song "Nothing Else Matters" which was released as a single in Europe.

== Singles ==
- The first single from the album was "What You're Made Of", which charted at No. 7 in the UK Singles Chart.
- "Breathe In" was the second single from the album, and is Silvas' highest charting UK single to date, peaking at No. 6.
- "The Game Is Won" was the third single, released in May 2005, which peaked at No. 38.
- The fourth single was "Don't Look Back", and it charted at No. 34. It shares its artwork and b-sides with "Nothing Else Matters".
- The fifth and final UK single was "Forget Me Not", a rerecording of an old song from Silvas' first unreleased album of the same name. The single reached No. 76.
- The final European single was "Nothing Else Matters", a cover of a Metallica song. It achieved success in the Netherlands, charting at No. 13. The cover and b-sides were the same as that of "Don't Look Back" in the UK.

== Track listings ==
No.	Title	Writer(s)	Length
1.	"Don't Look Back"	Silvas, Tzuke, Russell, Kearns, Peden	4:04
2.	"The Game Is Won"	Silvas, Tzuke, Kearns, Peden	4:00
3.	"Last Man Standing"	Silvas, Tzuke, Kearns, Peden	3:38
4.	"Forget Me Not"	Silvas, New	3:40
5.	"Breathe In"	Silvas, Tzuke, Kearns, Peden	3:49
6.	"Nothing Else Matters"	Hetfield, Ulrich	4:43
7.	"Without You"	Silvas, Kearns, Peden	3:53
8.	"What You're Made Of"	Silvas, Gordeno, Peden	4:12
9.	"Twisting the Chain"	Silvas, Tzuke, Russell, Kearns, Peden	4:23
10.	"No Defence"	Silvas	3:23
11.	"The Longer We're Apart"	Silvas, Parker	5:21
12.	"Like You Love Me"	Silvas, Tzuke, Kearns, Peden	3:36

UK bonus track
No.	Title	Writer(s)	Length
13.	"Seven Veils"	Silvas, Tzuke, Russell, Peden	3:30

Spanish bonus track
No.	Title	Writer(s)	Length
13.	"What You're Made Of" (Spanish version) (featuring Antonio Orozco)	Silvas, Gordeno, Peden	4:13

Dutch bonus DVD – Live at Studio 24, Hilversum
No.	Title	Writer(s)	Length
1.	"Overture"		0:44
2.	"Don't Look Back"	Silvas, Tzuke, Russell, Kearns, Peden	4:24
3.	"What You're Made Of"	Silvas, Gordeno, Peden	4:35
4.	"Breathe In"	Silvas, Tzuke, Kearns, Peden	4:20
5.	"Nothing Else Matters"	Hetfield, Ulrich	5:00
6.	"Twisting the Chain"	Silvas, Tzuke, Russell, Kearns, Peden	4:30
7.	"No Defence"	Silvas	3:49
8.	"Without You"	Silvas, Kearns, Peden	4:17
9.	"Last Man Standing"	Silvas, Tzuke, Kearns, Peden	4:05
10.	"The Game Is Won"	Silvas, Tzuke, Kearns, Peden	4:45
11.	"Forget Me Not"	Silvas, New	4:17
12.	"The Longer We're Apart"	Silvas, Parker	8:04

== B-sides ==
Title	Single(s)
"Love You This Much"	"What You're Made Of"
"Build Your World Around"	"What You're Made Of"
"This Isn't Like Me"	"Breathe In"
"Magpies"	"Breathe In"
"Sliding Down"	"The Game Is Won"
"Better Love Next Time"	"Don't Look Back" / "Nothing Else Matters"
"The Look of Love"	"Forget Me Not"
"Still"	"Forget Me Not"

== Credits ==
Musicians and Vocals

- Lucie Silvas – vocals, acoustic piano, backing vocals (1, 2, 5, 7, 9, 12, 13)
- Peter Gordeno – keyboards, acoustic piano (1, 3, 5, 7, 9)
- Graham Kearns – guitars
- Paul Turner – bass
- Charlie Russell – drums, programming
- Ian Stoddart – percussion (11)
- Anthony Pleeth – cello solo (6)
- Nick Ingman – string arrangements and conductor
- Isobel Griffiths – orchestra contractor
- Gavyn Wright – orchestra leader
- Mia Silvas – backing vocals (1, 2, 5, 7, 9, 12, 13)
- The London Community Gospel Choir – backing vocals (3, 11)

Production

- Matt Jagger – executive producer
- Michael Peden – executive producer, producer
- Martin Hayles – recording
- Dan Gautreau – recording assistant
- Michael Brauer – mixing
- Keith Gary – mix assistant, Pro Tools engineer
- Greg Calbi – mastering at Sterling Sound (New York, NY)
- Tom Bird – art direction, photographic production
- David Coffin – art direction, photographic production
- Simon Fowler – photography
- David Woolley – photography (pg. 9)
- Tony Duran – photography (pg. 13)
- Lucie Silvas – all other photography, liner notes
- Empire Artist Management UK – management

== Chart and certifications ==
=== Weekly charts ===
Chart (2004–06)	Peak position
Austrian Albums (Ö3 Austria)	13
Danish Albums (Hitlisten)	40
Dutch Albums (Album Top 100)	1
French Albums (SNEP)	50
Irish Albums (IRMA)	34
Scottish Albums (OCC)	15
Spanish Albums (PROMUSICAE)	7
UK Albums (OCC)	11

=== Year-end charts ===
Chart (2005)	Position
Dutch Albums (Album Top 100)	36
Chart (2006)	Position
Dutch Albums (Album Top 100)	7

=== Certifications and sales ===
Country	Certification	Sales
UK	Platinum	300,000
Netherlands	Platinum	70,000
Spain	Platinum	100,000
