= De temps en temps =

Single by Grégory Lemarchal

from the album La Voix d'un ange
- B-side: "Instrumental"
- Released: 11 June 2007
- Recorded: France
- Genre: Pop
- Length: 4:01
- Label: Mercury
- Songwriter(s): Davide Esposito, Grégory Lemarchal
- Producer(s): Rémi Lacroix

Grégory Lemarchal singles chronology
"SOS d'un terrien en détresse" (2007)	"De temps en temps" (2007)	"Le Lien" (2007)

"De temps en temps" (meaning "From Time to Time") is a 2007 song recorded by the French singer Grégory Lemarchal. It was released as the first single from his posthumous album, La Voix d'un ange, on 11 June 2007. The song was very successful in France and Belgium (Wallonia), topping the singles charts.

== Song information ==
Lyrics and music were composed by Grégory Lemarchal and Davide Esposito (who had also composed the original version in Italian-language of Lemarchal's debut single "Écris l'histoire").

With this song, Grégory Lemarchal carried out the best weekly sale of 2007 for a number-one single on the French Singles Chart : indeed, the single was sold more than 76,000 copies during its first week of release. These sales were qualified as "excellent" considering the collapse of the singles market in France, and "express[ed] the lively emotion which surround[ed] the singer's death".

In France, the single was straight number-one on the singles chart on 16 June, then dropped slowly, totaling 11 weeks in top ten, 21 weeks in the top 50 and 33 weeks in the top 100. It featured at number four on Annual Chart, with 191,650 sales. It entered the French Digital Chart at number 18 on 9 May, then jumped to a peak of number two the week after. It was ranked #48 on the End of the Year Chart.

The song is also available on Lemarchal's posthumous compilation, Rêves.

== Track listings ==
CD single

1. "De temps en temps" — 4:01
2. "De temps en temps" (instrumental version) — 4:01

Digital download

1. "De temps en temps" — 4:01

== Charts and sales ==
=== Peak positions ===
Chart (2007)	Peak position
Belgian (Wallonia) Singles Chart	1
Eurochart Hot 100 Singles	4
French Digital Chart	2
French Singles Chart	1
Swiss Singles Chart	10

=== Year-end charts ===
Chart (2007)	Position
Belgian (Wallonia) Singles Chart	9
French Airplay Chart	30
French Digital Chart	48
French Singles Chart	4
French TV Airplay Chart	38

=== Certifications ===
Certifications for "De temps en temps"
Region	Certification	Certified units/sales
Belgium (BEA)	Gold	25,000^{*}
^{*} Sales figures based on certification alone.
