= The Book of Love (film) =

American drama film

- Theatrical release poster
- Directed by: Bill Purple
- Written by: Robbie Pickering; Bill Purple
- Produced by: Jessica Biel; Mike Landry; Chuck Pacheco; Michelle Purple; Carlos Velazquez
- Starring: Jason Sudeikis; Jessica Biel; Maisie Williams; Mary Steenburgen; Orlando Jones; Paul Reiser
- Cinematography: James M. Muro
- Edited by: Tara Timpone
- Music by: Justin Timberlake
- Production companies: C Plus Pictures; Campfire; Iron Ocean Films; Nine Nights
- Distributed by: Electric Entertainment
- Release dates: April 14, 2016 (Tribeca); January 13, 2017 (United States)
- Running time: 107 minutes
- Country: United States
- Language: English

The Book of Love is a 2016 American drama film directed and rewritten by Bill Purple from an original script by Robbie Pickering featuring Maisie Williams, Jessica Biel, Jason Sudeikis, Mary Steenburgen, Orlando Jones, and Paul Reiser.

The film had its world premiere under its original title The Devil and the Deep Blue Sea at the Tribeca Film Festival on April 14, 2016. It was released in the United States on January 13, 2017, by Electric Entertainment.

== Synopsis ==
After the accidental death of his free-spirited pregnant wife, Penny, reserved architect Henry struggles to find meaning in his life and in the work that once consumed him. As he continues to work on the house he and Penny were building together, Henry is drawn to a mysterious young runaway named Millie whom Penny had asked Henry to help. Though Millie mistrusts Henry at first, the two build a tentative friendship as she reveals her ambition to build a raft to go find her father who was lost at sea. Taking on the father role he was meant to have, Henry neglects his job and other responsibilities to help Millie on her quest. As they work together, he comes to understand that she can help him to heal as much as he can help her. As Millie prepares to leave, Henry is briefly angered when he discovers that Millie possesses the first photograph Penny ever took of the two of them and the news article about her death, but this anger is forgotten when Millie is struck in the head by her sail and nearly drowns. Learning that Millie simply saw Penny's accident, Henry expresses gratitude that someone else was with his wife when she died. In the end, Henry joins Millie as they set sail together across the Atlantic.

== Cast ==
- Jason Sudeikis as Henry Herschel
- Maisie Williams as Millie Pearlman
- Jessica Biel as Penny Herschel
- Mary Steenburgen as Julia Mureaux
- Orlando Jones as Cornelius "Dumbass" Thibadeaux
- Richard Robichaux as Pascal
- Paul Reiser as Wendell
- Bryan Batt as Dr. Melvin
- Jayson Warner Smith as Glen, Millie's uncle
- Russ Russo as David Pearlman
- Cailey Fleming as Young Millie Pearlman
- Patch as Ahab

== Production ==
In May 2012, Jessica Biel, Chloë Grace Moretz, and Jeffrey Dean Morgan, were cast in the film, with Bill Purple directing from a screenplay by Robbie Pickering. Justin Timberlake served as the composer and music supervisor, Biel also served as a producer on the film, alongside Michelle Purple, Ross M. Dinerstein and Darby Angel, under their Iron Ocean Films, Preferred Content, and AngelWorld banners respectively. In March 2015, Jayson Warner Smith, Orlando Jones, Paul Reiser, Maisie Williams and Jason Sudeikis joined the cast of the film, with Sudeikis and Williams replacing Dean Morgan and Moretz.

== Release ==
The film had its world premiere at the Tribeca Film Festival on April 14, 2016. Shortly after, Electric Entertainment acquired U.S distribution rights to the film. It went onto screen at the Heartland Film Festival and Napa Valley Film Festival. The film was released into theaters on January 13, 2017.

== Reception ==
=== Critical response ===
On review aggregator website Rotten Tomatoes, the film has a score of 8% based on 12 reviews, with an average rating of 3/10. On Metacritic, the film has a score of 27 out of 100, based on 6 critics, indicating "generally unfavorable reviews".

== Music ==
The film's soundtrack, entitled The Book of Love (Original Motion Picture Soundtrack), was composed by Justin Timberlake and Mitchell Owens and released on January 13, 2017.

=== Track listing ===
| No. | Title | Performer | Length |
|---|---|---|---|
| 1. | "One of Those Stories" | | 2:43 |
| 2. | "Temerity" | | 0:41 |
| 3. | "So" | | 2:05 |
| 4. | "It's Just Its Nature" | | 2:30 |
| 5. | "She Likes the Rain" | | 1:15 |
| 6. | "I Designed It" | | 0:44 |
| 7. | "T-Bup" | | 0:58 |
| 8. | "The Shit" | | 2:59 |
| 9. | "That We Matter" | | 1:00 |
| 10. | "Pajamas" | | 1:21 |
| 11. | "I'm Sorry" | | 0:57 |
| 12. | "The Journal" | | 4:13 |
| 13. | "Wink and Mug" | | 0:56 |
| 14. | "The Detritus" | | 2:09 |
| 15. | "As Dreamers Do" | | 0:50 |
| 16. | "The Munchies" | | 1:13 |
| 17. | "As Dreamers Still Do" | | 1:43 |
| 18. | "It's a Raft" | | 1:59 |
| 19. | "Treads" | | 1:04 |
| 20. | "The Ballad of David Pearlman" | | 2:19 |
| 21. | "Who Was That?" | | 0:28 |
| 22. | "A Phenomena" | | 1:05 |
| 23. | "The Whole World Is Crazy" | | 3:44 |
| 24. | "Now We Just Need Some Help" | | 2:50 |
| 25. | "Really Something" | | 1:24 |
| 26. | "Like a Hurricane" | | 1:14 |
| 27. | "She Was..." | | 1:45 |
| 28. | "The People that Left a Mark" | | 3:07 |
| 29. | "The Book of Love" | The Shadowboxers | 3:38 |
| 30. | "We'll Make It" | | 2:40 |
| 31. | "It's Just Our Story" | | 4:16 |

- "The Book of Love" features uncredited vocals by Timberlake. It is a cover of the Magnetic Fields song of the same name.
