= Next Year (disambiguation) =

"Next Year" is a 2000 song by the Foo Fighters.

Next Year may also refer to:

- "Next Year" (Macklemore song), 2021
- "Next Year", a 1969 song by Paul Anka
- Next Year, a 1953 drama series published by Kraft Television Theatre
- "Next Year", a song by Two Door Cinema Club from the 2013 album Beacon

== See also ==
- Last Year (disambiguation)
- This Year (disambiguation)
