= E.G.O. =

Studio album by Lucie Silvas
- Released: 24 August 2018
- Studio: Battle Tapes Recording, Royal Plum Studio, Pioneer Studios Brush Hill Studios and Robot Lemon (Nashville, Tennessee)
- Genre: Pop, Country, Americana
- Length: 49:08
- Label: Furthest Point, Thirty Tigers
- Producer: Jon Green; Daniel Tashian; John Osborne

Lucie Silvas chronology
Letters to Ghosts (2015)	E.G.O. (2018)

Singles from E.G.O.
- 1. "Kite" Released: 2 August 2018; 2. "Black Jeans" Released: 4 March 2019

E.G.O. (an acronym for Everybody Gets Off) is the fourth studio album by British singer-songwriter Lucie Silvas. It was released on 24 August 2018 through Furthest Point and distributed by Thirty Tigers. The album failed to chart.

== Background ==
Going into the project, Silvas spoke about the album in an interview with The Boot: "No one knew what the concept was, even my manager didn't really know. We just went ahead and did it, and the record label, Thirty Tigers, saw it afterwards.They had no notion what it would be. With fewer cooks in the kitchen, I feel like we could be really creative with it."

== Track listing ==
No.	Title	Writer(s)	Length
1.	"Kite"	Lucie Silvas, Natalie Hemby, Gabe Simon	3:21
2.	"Girls from California"	Silvas, Hemby, Liz Rose	3:49
3.	"Smoking Your Weed"	Silvas, Josh Osborne, Kate York	3:17
4.	"I Want You All to Myself"	Silvas, Erin McCarley, Aron Wright	4:18
5.	"Black Jeans"	Silvas, Trent Dabbs, JD McPherson	5:06
6.	"First Rate Heartbreak"	Silvas, Jeremy Spillmann	4:20
7.	"Everything Looks Beautiful"	Silvas, Hemby, Simon	4:59
8.	"People Can Change"	Silvas, Barry Dean, Steve Robson	3:57
9.	"My Old Habits"	Silvas, Daniel Tashian, Keelan Donovan	3:27
10.	"Just for the Record"	Silvas, Jarrad Kritzstein, Ruston Kelly	4:07
11.	"E.G.O."	Silvas, Hemby, Elise Hayes	4:16
12.	"Change My Mind"	Silvas, Donovan, Tenille Townes	4:11
Total length:			49:08

== Personnel ==
- Lucie Silvas – vocals, backing vocals (1–6, 8, 10–12), acoustic piano (4, 10)
- Jon Green – acoustic piano (1, 2, 5, 7, 8), keyboards (1, 2, 4), bass (1–8, 11, 12), percussion (1, 4, 6), backing vocals (1, 3, 5, 6, 8, 11, 12), Hammond organ (2, 6, 7), acoustic guitar (6)
- Ian Fitchuk – acoustic piano (2, 7), Hammond organ (2, 7, 12), drums (7, 9), bass (9)
- Daniel Tashian – all other instruments (9)
- Dave Cohen – acoustic piano (10)
- Derek Wells – electric guitar (1–6, 8, 12)
- John Osborne – guitar solo (1), additional electric guitar (3), electric guitar (6), all other instruments (10), electric lead guitar (11)
- Jarrad Kritzstein – acoustic guitar (2, 6, 7, 11), backing vocals (7)
- Trent Dabbs – acoustic guitar (5)
- Ben Weaver – electric guitar (7, 11)
- Keelan Donovan – guitar vocal (9)
- Fred Ettringham – drums (1–6, 8, 12)
- Adam Box – drums (11)
- Gavin Fitzjohn – horns (3)
- David Henry – strings (10)
- Davide Rossi – string arrangements (2, 4, 7, 8)
- Natalie Hemby – backing vocals (1, 2)
- Erin McCarley – backing vocals (4)
- Aron Wright – backing vocals (4)
- Kristen Rogers – backing vocals (7)
- Elise Hayes – backing vocals (11)
- Jake "Fancy" Hagood – backing vocals (12)

=== Production ===
- Jon Green – producer (1–8, 11, 12)
- Daniel Tashian – producer (9), recording (9)
- John Osborne – producer (10), additional recording (10)
- Jeremy Ferguson – recording (1–8, 11, 12), mixing (7, 9–11)
- F. Reid Shippen – mixing (1–6, 8, 12)
- Keith Gattis – recording (10)
- Kevin Szymanski – recording (10)
- Daniel Bacigalupi – mix assistant (1–6, 8, 12)
- Alena Moran – mix assistant (1–6, 8, 12)
- Greg Calbi – mastering at Sterling Sound (New York, NY)
- Fetzer Design – art direction, design
- Sonya Jasinski – photography
- Jon Leshay – management

== Release history ==
List of regions, release dates, formats, label and references
Region	Date	Format(s)	Label	Ref.
Various	24 August 2018	CD; digital download; LP	Thirty Tigers	
