= Nothing Else Matters =

1992 single by Metallica

Single by Metallica

from the album Metallica
- B-side: "Enter Sandman" (live)
- Released: April 20, 1992
- Recorded: May 30, 1991
- Studio: One on One (Los Angeles)
- Genre: Soft rock
- Length: 6:28
- Label: Elektra
- Composers: James Hetfield; Lars Ulrich
- Lyricist: James Hetfield
- Producers: Bob Rock; James Hetfield; Lars Ulrich

Metallica singles chronology
"The Unforgiven" (1991)	"Nothing Else Matters" (1992)	"Wherever I May Roam" (1992)

Music video
- "Nothing Else Matters" on YouTube

"Nothing Else Matters" is a song by American heavy metal band Metallica. A power ballad, it was released on April 20, 1992 by Elektra Records, as the third single from their self-titled fifth studio album (1991). The song peaked at numbers 31 and 34 on the US Cash Box Top 100 and Billboard Hot 100 charts. It also peaked at number 11 on the Billboard Album Rock Tracks chart, number six on the UK Singles Chart, number one in Denmark, and reached the top ten on many other European charts. The accompanying music video was directed by Adam Dubin. Recognized as one of Metallica's best known and most popular songs, it has become a staple in live performances.

== History ==
Lead singer and rhythm guitarist James Hetfield wrote the song (credited to Hetfield/Ulrich) in 1990 while on tour, when Hetfield "was bumming out about being away from home." Initially, the song was not meant to be released, as Hetfield had written it for himself, working on the song privately after shows.

Hetfield was reluctant to share it with the band, fearing that its vulnerability was inconsistent with Metallica's music, but after drummer Lars Ulrich heard it, it was considered for the album. Hetfield described his reservations about presenting the song to the band: "I thought that Metallica could only be the four of us. These are songs about destroying things, head banging, bleeding for the crowd, whatever it is, as long as it wasn't about chicks and fast cars, even though that's what we liked. The song was about a girlfriend at the time. It turned out to be a pretty big song." It was one of four demo songs recorded by the band on August 13, 1990.

"Nothing Else Matters" is a rare example from the band of a "full-fledged love song", an unusual subject for the band at the time, their earlier ballad-style songs having generally dealt with darker themes such as death, loneliness, and war. Written as a love song to his girlfriend while he was homesick on tour, its opening figure, played on four open guitar strings, was conceived while Hetfield was speaking with her on the telephone. Hetfield later said that the experience of producing the song helped broaden his view of the emotions that could be expressed in the band's songwriting, and that the lyrics were written broadly enough to take on meanings beyond the relationship that inspired them, with the song having come to be associated with long-distance relationships, and having been used as a wedding song.

== Composition ==
Its intro is an E minor arpeggio (transposed one half-step lower on stage performances) beginning with the open low E followed by the open G, B and high E strings.

It is one of the few Metallica songs in which Hetfield plays the guitar solo. Lead guitarist Kirk Hammett does not play on the studio recording, making it one of the few in the whole Metallica repertoire, along with Cliff Burton's "(Anesthesia) Pulling Teeth", in which he does not appear. Hammett stated he did not learn how to play the song until they were well into the tour for the album.

The orchestral arrangements were written by award-winning composer Michael Kamen.

== Music video ==
The music video for "Nothing Else Matters" was filmed in Spring 1991 in North Hollywood during the recording of Metallica album. It premiered on MTV on February 25, 1992. It was directed by Adam Dubin and edited by Sean Fullan. The clip consists of parts of the A Year and a Half in the Life of Metallica documentary, which was shot during the recordings of Metallica. One of them shows Hetfield playing a Gibson EDS-1275 guitar during the second chorus. MTV will not air the video during daytime hours anymore because it features nudity in the form of pin-up posters and Playboy centerfolds that are taped up in the studio. It also has a picture of Winger's Kip Winger which Ulrich is seen throwing darts at. On the band's 2006 music video compilation DVD, the posters are censored, as was done with the nudity featured in the music videos for "Turn the Page" and "Whiskey in the Jar".

In August 2021, the music video hit one billion views on YouTube, making it Metallica's first music video to do so.

== Live ==
The song has become a staple in Metallica's live performances, and has been dedicated to their fans.

A live version in which this can be heard can be found on the CD/DVD Orgullo, Pasión y Gloria: Tres Noches en la Ciudad de México. Other live recordings can be found on Live Shit: Binge & Purge, on S&M, Cunning Stunts DVD, the DVD/Blu-ray The Big 4 Live from Sofia, Bulgaria as well as on the soundtrack for the band's feature film Through the Never, and also featured on 2019 S&M follow-up live album, S&M2.

== Track listing ==
U.S. cassette
No.	Title	Writer(s)	Length
1.	"Nothing Else Matters"	James Hetfield; Lars Ulrich	6:30
2.	"Enter Sandman" (Live)	Hetfield; Ulrich; Kirk Hammett	5:26

International single
No.	Title	Writer(s)	Length
1.	"Nothing Else Matters"	Hetfield; Ulrich	6:30
2.	"Enter Sandman" (Live)	Hetfield; Ulrich; Hammett	5:26
3.	"Harvester of Sorrow" (Live)	Hetfield; Ulrich	6:02
4.	"Nothing Else Matters" (Demo)	Hetfield; Ulrich	5:52

Live at Wembley Stadium, London, April 20, 1992
No.	Title	Writer(s)	Length
1.	"Enter Sandman"	Hetfield; Ulrich; Hammett	5:39
2.	"Sad but True"	Hetfield; Ulrich	5:30
3.	"Nothing Else Matters"	Hetfield; Ulrich	6:17

- This version was released in Europe April 27, 1992, and it contained the three songs Metallica played at the Freddie Mercury Tribute Concert on April 20, 1992, at Wembley Stadium.

1999 CD single
No.	Title	Writer(s)	Length
1.	"Nothing Else Matters" (Live)	Hetfield; Ulrich	6:47
2.	"For Whom the Bell Tolls" (Live)	Hetfield; Ulrich; Cliff Burton	4:52
3.	"- Human" (Live)	Hetfield; Ulrich	4:19
4.	"Nothing Else Matters" (Video)	Hetfield; Ulrich

== Personnel ==
- James Hetfield – guitars, vocals
- Jason Newsted – bass
- Lars Ulrich – drums

Additional personnel

- Michael Kamen – orchestral arrangement
- Randy Staub – tambourine
- London Symphony Orchestra

== Charts ==
=== Weekly charts ===
Chart (1992–1993)	Peak position
Australia (ARIA)	8
Belgium (Ultratop 50 Flanders)	5
Canada Retail Singles (The Record)	4
Canada Contemporary Hit Radio (The Record)	30
Canada Top Singles (RPM)	41
Denmark (IFPI)	1
Europe (Eurochart Hot 100)	11
Finland (The Official Finnish Charts)	4
France (SNEP)	10
Germany (GfK)	9
Holland Airplay (Music & Media)	2
Ireland (IRMA)	6
Italy (Musica e dischi)	4
Netherlands (Dutch Top 40)	5
Netherlands (Single Top 100)	4
New Zealand (Recorded Music NZ)	11
Spain (AFYVE)	5
Sweden (Sverigetopplistan)	14
Switzerland (Schweizer Hitparade)	5
UK Singles (Official Charts)	6
US Billboard Hot 100	34
US Mainstream Rock Airplay (Billboard)	11
US Cash Box Top 100	31

Chart (1999–2000)	Peak position
Austria (Ö3 Austria Top 40)	6
Sweden (Sverigetopplistan)	14

Chart (2007–2010)	Peak position
Denmark (Tracklisten)	23
Finland (Suomen virallinen lista)	14
Ireland (IRMA)	28
Norway (VG-lista)	3
Sweden (Sverigetopplistan)	12
Switzerland (Schweizer Hitparade)	10
UK Singles (Official Charts)	53

Chart (2012–2022)	Peak position
Hungary (Single Top 40)	18
France (SNEP)	162
Switzerland (Schweizer Hitparade)	40

Chart (2025–2026)	Peak position
Greece International (IFPI)	8
Portugal (AFP)	198

=== Year-end charts ===
Chart (1992)	Position
Australia (ARIA)	69
Belgium (Ultratop 50 Flanders)	34
Germany (Media Control)	26
Netherlands (Dutch Top 40)	22
Netherlands (Single Top 100)	21
Sweden (Topplistan)	71
Switzerland (Schweizer Hitparade)	12
US Album Rock Tracks (Billboard)	39

Chart (2000)	Position
Austria (Ö3 Austria Top 40)	31

Chart (2008)	Position
Switzerland (Schweizer Hitparade)	100

== Certifications ==
Region	Certification	Certified units/sales
Australia (ARIA)	7× Platinum	490,000^{‡}
Austria (IFPI Austria)	Gold	25,000^{*}
Belgium (BRMA)	Gold	25,000^{*}
Brazil (Pro-Música Brasil)	Gold	30,000^{‡}
Denmark (IFPI Danmark)	2× Platinum	180,000^{‡}
Germany (BVMI)	2× Platinum	1,200,000^{‡}
Italy (FIMI)	2× Platinum	100,000^{‡}
New Zealand (RMNZ)	6× Platinum	180,000^{‡}
Portugal (AFP)	4× Platinum	100,000^{‡}
Spain (Promusicae)	2× Platinum	120,000^{‡}
Sweden (GLF)	Gold	25,000^{^}
United Kingdom (BPI)	2× Platinum	1,200,000^{‡}
United States (RIAA)	Gold	500,000^{^}
Streaming
Greece (IFPI Greece)	2× Platinum	4,000,000^{†}
^{*} Sales figures based on certification alone.^{^} Shipments figures based on certification alone.^{‡} Sales+streaming figures based on certification alone.^{†} Streaming-only figures based on certification alone.

== Alternative versions ==
=== "Nothing Else Matters '99" ===
"Nothing Else Matters '99 (live)"

Single by Metallica

from the album S&M
- B-side: "For Whom the Bell Tolls" (S&M version); "- Human"
- Released: November 22, 1999
- Recorded: April 21–22, 1999
- Venue: Berkeley Community Theatre, Berkeley, California
- Length: 6:47
- Label: Elektra
- Songwriters: James Hetfield; Lars Ulrich
- Producers: Bob Rock; James Hetfield; Lars Ulrich; Michael Kamen

Metallica singles chronology
"Die, Die My Darling" (1999)	"Nothing Else Matters '99 (live)" (1999)	"No Leaf Clover" (2000)

For its appearance on S&M, its orchestration was arranged by Michael Kamen conducting the San Francisco Symphony Orchestra. This live version is featured on the album S&M. It was also released as the single "Nothing Else Matters '99", which included the b-sides "-Human", and the S&M version of "For Whom the Bell Tolls", on November 22, 1999. This version was also played with guitars tuned to E♭.

==== Charts ====
Weekly charts

Chart (1999)	Peak position
Australia (ARIA)	28
Belgium (Ultratop 50 Flanders)	1
Belgium (Ultratop 50 Wallonia)	33
Germany (GfK)	2
Netherlands (Dutch Top 40)	5
Netherlands (Single Top 100)	3
Switzerland (Schweizer Hitparade)	4

Year-end charts

Chart (2000)	Position
Belgium (Ultratop 50 Flanders)	12
Europe (Eurochart Hot 100)	42
Germany (Media Control)	20
Netherlands (Dutch Top 40)	9
Netherlands (Single Top 100)	21
Switzerland (Schweizer Hitparade)	31

=== "Elevator Version" ===
There is also an acoustic remix of "Nothing Else Matters" that is called "Elevator Version", with no electric guitars (replaced by acoustic guitars, even for the solo), Kamen's orchestrations, and Hetfield's voice only; it appears as the B-side to "Sad but True".

=== Jungle Cruise version ===
An instrumental version of "Nothing Else Matters" appears on the soundtrack of the 2021 film Jungle Cruise. The band collaborated with the film's composer James Newton Howard to record a new orchestral arrangement of the song for the film.

== Lucie Silvas version ==
"Nothing Else Matters"

Single by Lucie Silvas

from the album Breathe In
- B-side: "Better Love Next Time" (demo)
- Released: October 31, 2005
- Genre: Pop
- Length: 4:36
- Label: Mercury
- Composers: James Hetfield; Lars Ulrich
- Lyricist: James Hetfield
- Producer: Mike Peden

Lucie Silvas singles chronology
"Forget Me Not" (2005)	"Nothing Else Matters" (2005)	"Everytime I Think of You" (2006)

"Nothing Else Matters" is a special Europe-only single by British singer-songwriter Lucie Silvas. It was released in exactly the same way as "Don't Look Back", with the same B-sides and artwork.

=== Track listing ===
CD1
No.	Title	Writer(s)	Length
1.	"Nothing Else Matters" (Edit)	James Hetfield, Lars Ulrich	3:07
2.	"Breathe In" (Live in Denmark)	Lucie Silvas, Judie Tzuke, Graham Kearns, Mike Peden	3:32

CD2
No.	Title	Writer(s)	Length
1.	"Nothing Else Matters" (Edit)	Hetfield, Ulrich	3:07
2.	"Twisting the Chain" (Acoustic)	Silvas, Charlie Russell, Kearns, Peden	3:55
3.	"Better Love Next Time" (Demo)	Tzuke, Kearns	3:40
4.	"Nothing Else Matters" (Video)	Hetfield, Ulrich

=== Charts ===
Chart (2005)	Peak position
Dutch Top 40	13
Germany	38
Greece	35
Eurochart Hot 100	160

== Miley Cyrus version ==
"Nothing Else Matters"

Promotional single by Miley Cyrus featuring Watt, Elton John, Yo-Yo Ma, Robert Trujillo and Chad Smith

from the album The Metallica Blacklist and The Lockdown Sessions
- Released: June 22, 2021
- Studio: Gold Tooth Music (Beverly Hills, CA)
- Length: 6:35
- Label: Blackened
- Songwriters: James Hetfield; Lars Ulrich
- Producer: Andrew Watt

Music video
- "Nothing Else Matters" on YouTube

On January 7, 2021, it was announced that Miley Cyrus would be releasing a cover version that would feature Elton John on piano, drummer Chad Smith from Red Hot Chili Peppers, Metallica's bassist Robert Trujillo and cellist Yo-Yo Ma. Cyrus also announced in October 2020 that she plans to release a full album of Metallica covers. Cyrus previously covered "Nothing Else Matters" during her 2019 set at Glastonbury. The cover, produced by Andrew Watt, was released on June 22, 2021, as a promotional single from Metallica's tribute album The Metallica Blacklist, released on September 10. The video for this version was uploaded the same day on Cyrus' YouTube channel. The cover is also featured on John's album The Lockdown Sessions, which released on October 22.

Later while Miley Cyrus was appearing on the Howard Stern show with Metallica; Howard Stern introduced Elton John as a surprise guest who informed Metallica that he believes the song to be "one the best songs ever written" which left James Hetfield speechless and in tears. Elton John then finished his praise of the band by declaring Metallica "one of the greatest bands of all time".

=== Charts ===
Chart (2021)	Peak position
New Zealand Hot Singles (RMNZ)	26
UK Rock & Metal (Official Charts)	26
UK Single Sales (Official Charts)	29
US Hot Rock & Alternative Songs (Billboard)	36

== Hardwell mashup ==
On December 23, 2022, Hardwell released a mashup of "Nothing Else Matters" and his song "F*cking Society", featured on the deluxe edition of his album Rebels Never Die.

== Other cover versions ==
- The Metallica Blacklist features cover versions by a variety of artists, including Cyrus, Phoebe Bridgers, Dave Gahan, Mickey Guyton, Dermot Kennedy, Mon Laferte, Igor Levit, My Morning Jacket, PG Roxette, Darius Rucker, Chris Stapleton and Tresor.

== Bibliography ==
- Clerc, Benoît (2023). Metallica All the Songs: The Story Behind Every Track. London: Cassell. p. 194. ISBN 978-1-78472-893-9.
