= Breathe In (song) =

2005 single by Lucie Silvas

- CD1

Single by Lucie Silvas

from the album Breathe In
- B-side: "This Isn't Like Me"; "Magpies"
- Released: 17 January 2005
- Studio: Studio 360
- Length: 3:50
- Label: Mercury
- Songwriters: Lucie Silvas; Judie Tzuke; Graham Kearns; Mike Peden
- Producer: Mike Peden

Lucie Silvas singles chronology
"What You're Made Of" (2004)	"Breathe In" (2005)	"The Game Is Won" (2005)

Alternative covers
- CD2

"Breathe In" is the second single released from English singer-songwriter Lucie Silvas's debut album, Breathe In. The song outpeaked her previous single "What You're Made Of" on the UK Singles Charts by one position, reaching number six. In Ireland, the song was not as successful as "What You're Made Of", stalling at number 34. It also charted in Germany and the Netherlands.

== Track listings ==
UK CD1
No.	Title	Writer(s)	Length
1.	"Breathe In"	Lucie Silvas, Judie Tzuke, Graham Kearns, Mike Peden
2.	"This Isn't Like Me"	Silvas, Charlie Russell, Kearns, Peden
3.	"Magpies"	Richard Lobb
4.	"Breathe In" (video)	Silvas, Tzuke, Kearns, Peden

UK CD2
No.	Title	Writer(s)	Length
1.	"Breathe In"	Silvas, Tzuke, Kearns, Peden
2.	"What You're Made Of" (live at Whitfield Street)	Silvas, Peter Gordeno, Peden

== Credits and personnel ==
Credits are lifted from the UK CD1 liner notes.

Studios

- Recorded at Studio 360
- Mixed at Quad Studios (New York City)

Personnel

- Lucie Silvas – writing, vocals, background vocals
- Judie Tzuke – writing
- Graham Kearns – writing, guitars
- Mike Peden – writing, production
- Mia Silvas – background vocals
- Graham Kearns – guitars
- Paul Turner – bass
- Peter Gordeno – keyboards, piano
- Charlie Russell – drums, drum programming
- Martin Hayles – recording
- Dan Gautreau – recording assistance
- Michael H. Brauer – mixing
- Keith Gary – mixing assistance, Pro Tools engineering

== Charts ==
=== Weekly charts ===
Chart (2005)	Peak position
Germany (GfK)	86
Ireland (IRMA)	34
Netherlands (Single Top 100)	41
Scottish Singles Sales (Official Charts)	6
UK Singles (Official Charts)	6

=== Year-end charts ===
Chart (2005)	Position
UK Singles (OCC)	165
