= Don't Look Back (Lucie Silvas song) =

- CD1

Single by Lucie Silvas

from the album Breathe In
- B-side: "Twisting the Chain" (acoustic), "Better Love Next Time" (demo)
- Released: 25 July 2005
- Length: 4:04
- Label: Mercury
- Songwriter(s): Lucie Silvas, Judie Tzuke, Charlie Russell, Graham Kearns, Mike Peden
- Producer(s): Matt Jagger, Mike Peden

Lucie Silvas singles chronology
| "The Game Is Won" (2005) | "Don't Look Back" (2005) | "Nothing Else Matters" (2005) |

Alternative covers
- CD2

"Don't Look Back" is the fourth single of British singer-songwriter Lucie Silvas from her 2004 debut album, Breathe In.

== Track listings ==
CD1
| No. | Title | Writer(s) | Length |
|---|---|---|---|
| 1. | "Don't Look Back" | Lucie Silvas, Judie Tzuke, Charlie Russell, Graham Kearns, Mike Peden | 4:04 |
| 2. | "Breathe In" ((live in Denmark)) | Silvas, Tzuke, Kearns, Peden | 3:32 |

CD2
| No. | Title | Writer(s) | Length |
|---|---|---|---|
| 1. | "Don't Look Back" | Silvas, Tzuke, Russell, Kearns, Peden | 4:04 |
| 2. | "Twisting the Chain" (acoustic) | Silvas, Russell, Kearns, Peden | 3:55 |
| 3. | "Better Love Next Time" (demo) | Tzuke, Kearns | 3:40 |
| 4. | "Don't Look Back" (video) | Silvas, Tzuke, Russell, Kearns, Peden |

== Charts ==
| Chart (2005) | Peak position |
|---|---|
| Ireland (IRMA) | 48 |
| Scotland (OCC) | 24 |
| UK Singles (OCC) | 34 |
