= Je deviens moi =

Studio album by Grégory Lemarchal
- Released: April 17, 2005
- Recorded: France
- Genre: Pop
- Label: Universal, Mercury

Grégory Lemarchal chronology
Je deviens moi (2005)	Olympia 06 (2006)

Singles from Je deviens moi
- 1. "Écris l'histoire" Released: March 29, 2005; 2. "Je suis en vie" Released: July 18, 2005; 3. "À corps perdu" Released: February 2006

Je deviens moi (meaning "I Become Myself") is the name of the first studio album recorded by the French singer Grégory Lemarchal. It was released on April 17, 2005 and contains the hit singles "Écris l'histoire" and "Je suis en vie". The album topped the chart in France, and was also a success in Belgium (Wallonia). It remained the first and the only studio album of the singer recorded and released when he was living.

There are two formats of the album : the first one is a simple CD, and the second one is a collector edition containing a CD plus a DVD.

The album was a re-issued after Lemarchal's death, reaching #1 on the French Back Catalogue Chart (chart for albums that have been released two years earlier), and #2 on the French Digital Chart.

== Track listing ==
1. "Je deviens moi" (Peter Plate, Ulf Leo Sommer, AnNa R., Katia Landreas) — 3:37
2. "Je suis en vie" (Alana Filippi, Rémi Lacroix) — 3:44
3. "Écris l'histoire" (Francesco de Benedittis, Paul Manners, David Esposito) — 4:17
4. "À corps perdu" (Alexandre Lessertisseur, R. Jericho, V. Filho) — 4:13
5. "Le Feu sur les planches" (Eleonor Coquelin, Laurent Mesambret) — 4:16
6. "Je t'écris" (Yvan Cassar, Marc Lévy) — 6:44
7. "Pardonne-moi" (Frédéric Kocourek, Julien Thomas) — 4:08
8. "Mon ange" (Benedittis, Paul Manners, Esposito, Chet) — 3:59
9. "Promets-moi" (Coquelin, Mesambret) — 3:36
10. "Il n'y a qu'un pas" (Filippi, Lacroix) — 3:54
11. "Le Bonheur tout simplement" (Romano Musumarra, Luc Plamondon) — 3:59
12. "Une vie moins ordinaire" (Katia Landreas, Francis Eg White, Louis Elliot) — 4:09

DVD

1. "Grégory Lemarchal - droit dans les yeux", a documentary by Séb Brisard + Bonus

== Charts ==
Chart (2005)	Peak position
Belgian (Wallonia) Albums Chart	2
French SNEP Albums Chart	1
Swiss Albums Chart	20
Chart (2007)	Peak position
French Back Catalogue Chart	1
French Digital Chart	2

End of year chart (2005)	Position
Belgian (Wallonia) Albums Chart	47
French Albums Chart	45
End of the year chart (2007)	Position
French Back Catalogue Chart	1
French Digital Chart	26

== Certifications ==
Certifications for Je deviens moi
Region	Certification	Certified units/sales
France (SNEP)	2× Gold	200,000^{*}
^{*} Sales figures based on certification alone.
