= What You're Made Of (Lucie Silvas song) =

2004 single by Lucie Silvas

Single by Lucie Silvas

from the album Breathe In
- B-side: "Build Your World Around"; "Love You This Much"
- Released: 4 October 2004
- Studio: Studio 360
- Length: 4:12 (album version); 3:45 (radio edit)
- Label: Mercury
- Songwriters: Lucie Silvas; Peter Gordeno; Mike Peden
- Producer: Mike Peden

Lucie Silvas singles chronology
"It's Too Late" (2000)	"What You're Made Of" (2004)	"Breathe In" (2005)

Grégory Lemarchal singles chronology
"À corps perdu" (2005)	"Même si (What You're Made Of)" (2006)	"Le Feu sur les planches" (2006)

"What You're Made Of" is the first single from British singer Lucie Silvas' debut album, Breathe In (2004). Released on 4 October 2004, the song debuted and peaked at number seven on the UK Singles Chart and reached the top 30 in Austria, Ireland, the Netherlands, and Sweden.

Silvas subsequently recorded two different versions of the song: one with French singer Grégory Lemarchal and another with Spanish singer Antonio Orozco. The French version—titled "Même si (What You're Made Of)"—peaked at number two in France and charted strongly in Wallonia and Switzerland. In 2006, Silvas recorded a third version with the Dutch Metropole Orchestra that became a minor hit in the Netherlands.

== Track listings ==
UK and Irish CD1
No.	Title	Writer(s)	Length
1.	"What You're Made Of" (radio edit)	Lucie Silvas, Peter Gordeno, Mike Peden
2.	"What You're Made Of" (acoustic version)	Silvas, Gordeno, Peden

UK and Irish CD2
No.	Title	Writer(s)	Length
1.	"What You're Made Of"	Silvas, Gordeno, Peden
2.	"Love You This Much"	Silvas
3.	"Build Your World Around"	Silvas, Charlie Russell, Graham Kearns, Peden
4.	"What You're Made Of" (enhanced video)	Silvas, Gordeno, Peden

French CD single (with Grégory Lemarchal)
No.	Title	Writer(s)	Length
1.	"Même si (What You're Made Of)"	Isabelle Bernal, Silvas, Gordeno, Peden	3:50
2.	"What You're Made Of" (radio edit)	Silvas, Gordeno, Peden	3:50

Dutch CD single (with the Metropole Orchestra)
No.	Title	Writer(s)	Length
1.	"What You're Made Of" (recorded on 5 April 2006)	Silvas, Gordeno, Peden
2.	"Without You" (recorded live on 27 May 2005)	Silvas, Kearns, Peden

== Credits and personnel ==
Credits are lifted from the UK CD1 liner notes.

Studios

- Recorded at Studio 360
- Strings recorded at Abbey Road Studios (London, England)
- Mixed at Quad Studios (New York City)

Personnel

- Lucie Silvas – writing, vocals, piano
- Peter Gordeno – writing, keyboards
- Mike Peden – writing, percussion, production
- Graham Kearns – guitars
- Paul Turner – bass
- Charlie Russell – drums, drum programming
- Martin Hayles – recording
- Dan Gautreau – recording assistance
- Gary Thomas – recording (strings)
- Michael H. Brauer – mixing
- Keith Gary – mixing assistant, Pro Tools engineering
- Nick Ingman – string arrangement, conducting
- Gavyn Wright – concertmaster
- Isobel Griffiths – orchestra contracting

== Charts ==
=== Original version ===
==== Weekly charts ====
Chart (2004–2005)	Peak position
Austria (Ö3 Austria Top 40)	22
Belgium (Ultratip Bubbling Under Flanders)	13
Germany (GfK)	73
Greece (IFPI)	26
Ireland (IRMA)	19
Netherlands (Dutch Top 40)	28
Netherlands (Single Top 100)	23
Scottish Singles Sales (Official Charts)	9
Sweden (Sverigetopplistan)	21
Switzerland (Schweizer Hitparade)	46
UK Singles (Official Charts)	7

==== Year-end charts ====
Chart (2004)	Position
UK Singles (OCC)	171

=== Duet with Grégory Lemarchal ===
==== Weekly charts ====
Chart (2006)	Peak position
Belgium (Ultratop 50 Wallonia)	11
Europe (Eurochart Hot 100)	8
France (SNEP)	2
Switzerland (Schweizer Hitparade)	26

==== Year-end charts ====
Chart (2004)	Position
Belgium (Ultratop 50 Wallonia)	45
France (SNEP)	41

=== Metropole Orchestra version ===
Chart (2006)	Peak position
Netherlands (Single Top 100)	71
