= Forget Me Not (EP) =

EP by Lucie Silvas
- Released: 2000
- Genres: Pop, adult contemporary
- Length: 18:59
- Label: Chrysalis
- Producer: Howard New

Lucie Silvas chronology
Forget Me Not (2000)	Breathe In (2004)

Singles from Forget Me Not
- 1. "It's Too Late" Released: 2000

Forget Me Not is a five track promotional album sampler by British pop singer-songwriter Lucie Silvas, released in 2000 in the United Kingdom. Two versions of the sampler were released—one with artwork and one without.

== Background ==
Silvas was signed to EMI Records in 2000 and released her debut single "It's Too Late" on 17 June 2000. It failed to create much interest, charting at only No. 62. Lucie was dropped from EMI before her debut album was released. However, two album samplers of the unreleased album, which was to be titled Forget Me Not, were in circulation. Each sampler contained the same four tracks ("Tonight", "Diggin' a Hole", "Forget Me Not" and the single "It's Too Late"). The fifth track differed between the two samplers. One sampler, with a picture of Lucie as shown in the infobox, contained the track "That's Why I Love You", but the other sampler, which had a blue cover with simply "Lucie Silvas" and "Album Sampler" written on it, had the song "Take Me Back" written on it. The second album sampler with the blue cover is considerably rarer, which explains why all of these songs are on sites such as YouTube, except "Take Me Back".

"Forget Me Not" was re-recorded for Lucie's actual debut album Breathe In, then released as a single in 2005.

== Track listing ==
Version 1 – With album artwork

No.	Title	Writer(s)	Length
1.	"It's Too Late" (Radio version)	Lucie Silvas, Howard New	3:50
2.	"Tonight" (Radio version)	Silvas, Ian Lewis	4:14
3.	"That's Why I Love You"	Silvas, Marc Hall	3:35
4.	"Diggin' a Hole"	Silvas, New	4:15
5.	"Forget Me Not"	Silvas, New	3:43

Version 2 – Without album artwork

No.	Title	Writer(s)	Length
1.	"Take Me Back"	Silvas, Gary Barlow	4:29
2.	"It's Too Late" (Radio version)	Silvas, New	3:50
3.	"Tonight" (Radio version)	Silvas, Lewis	4:14
4.	"Forget Me Not"	Silvas, New	3:43
5.	"Diggin' a Hole"	Silvas, New	4:15

== B-sides ==
Title	Single(s)
"Stay the Way"	"It's Too Late"
