= Last Year =

Single by Lucie Silvas

from the album The Same Side
- Released: 6 November 2006
- Genre: Pop
- Label: Mercury Records
- Songwriter(s): Lucie Silvas, Judie Tzuke, Charlie Russell, Graham Kearns

Lucie Silvas singles chronology
"Everytime I Think of You" (2006)	"Last Year" (2006)	"Sinking In" (2007)

"Last Year" is a song recorded by singer-songwriter Lucie Silvas, released as the first single off her second album The Same Side in the UK. Formerly, "Everytime I Think of You" was released as the first single in the Netherlands, which has already peaked at the number one position.

== Formats and track listings ==
UK CD
No.	Title	Writer(s)	Length
1.	"Last Year"	Lucie Silvas, Judie Tzuke, Charlie Russell, Graham Kearns	4:06
2.	"Morning to a Child"	Silvas, Richard Cardwell	3:25

== Chart performance ==
=== Charts ===
Chart (2006)	Peak position
UK Singles Chart	79
Dutch Top 100 Single Sales	66
IRE Singles Chart	114
Spanish Cadena Hot 100	12
Spanish Los 40	18 (3)
Spanish Flaix Hot 30	14
