= Forget Me Not (Lucie Silvas song) =

Single by Lucie Silvas

from the album Breathe In
- B-side: "The Look Of Love", "Still
- Released: 19 December 2005
- Recorded: London, 2004
- Genre: Piano pop
- Length: 3:42 (Album Version)
- Label: Mercury
- Songwriters: Lucie Silvas, New
- Producer: Mike Peden

Lucie Silvas singles chronology
"Don't Look Back" (2005)	"Forget Me Not" (2005)	"Nothing Else Matters" (2005)

"Forget Me Not" is the fifth and final UK single release from the début album Breathe In, by the English singer-songwriter, Lucie Silvas.

== Track listing ==
UK CD
No.	Title	Writer(s)	Length
1.	"Forget Me Not"	Lucie Silvas, Howard New	3:42
2.	"The Look Of Love"	Burt Bacharach, Hal David	3:01
3.	"Still"	Silvas, Moore	3:14
4.	"Breathe In (Video)"	Silvas, New

All songs written by Lucie Silvas and Howard New.

iTunes Live Exclusive
No.	Title	Length
1.	"Forget Me Not" (Live from Brighton)	3:43
2.	"Forget Me Not" (Live from London)	3:44
3.	"Forget Me Not" (Live from Manchester)	3:42
4.	"Forget Me Not" (Live from Glasgow)	3:36
5.	"Forget Me Not" (Live from Newcastle)	3:40
6.	"Forget Me Not" (Live from York)	3:40
7.	"Forget Me Not" (Live from Warwick)	3:41
8.	"Forget Me Not" (Live from Cambridge)	3:45
9.	"Forget Me Not" (Live from Basingstoke)	3:42
10.	"Forget Me Not" (Live from Belfast)	3:48
Total length:		36:54

== Chart performance ==
Chart	Peak position
UK Singles Chart	76
