= Grégory Lemarchal =

French singer (1983–2007)

Background information
- Born: Grégory Jean-Paul Lemarchal; 13 May 1983; La Tronche, Auvergne-Rhône-Alpes, France
- Died: 30 April 2007 (aged 23) Suresnes, Île-de-France, France
- Genres: Pop/Rock
- Occupation: Singer
- Years active: 1999–2007
- Label: Universal Music Group

Grégory Jean-Paul Lemarchal (13 May 1983 – 30 April 2007), known professionally as Grégory Lemarchal, was a French singer who rose to fame by winning the fourth series of the reality television show Star Academy, which was broadcast on the TF1.

He died at the age of 23 of health complications (cystic fibrosis) while waiting in hospital for a lung transplant. A posthumous album, La Voix d'un ange, was released with profits going towards the Association Grégory Lemarchal charity. A compilation, Rêves, was released in 2009. He has sold more than 2 million albums.

== Life and career ==
=== 1983–2002: Early life ===
Lemarchal was born in La Tronche, Isère to Pierre and Laurence Lemarchal, who also had a daughter named Leslie. At twenty months of age he was diagnosed with cystic fibrosis, a genetic condition which affects the lungs, liver, pancreas and intestine.

Growing up near Chambéry, Lemarchal enjoyed sports such as basketball and football, and even considered becoming involved in sports journalism. Nevertheless, his passion for music and rock n'roll dancing was irresistible. In 1997, at the age of 14, he became the winner of France Rock 'N' Roll, a rock 'n' roll dancing competition.

In 1999, Lemarchal auditioned for a talent show, Graines de stars, by singing a solo rendition of Daniel Balavoine's "Le chanteur", as well as performing in a trio with two other contestants singing "Foule sentimentale" by Alain Souchon. This initial attempt failed, but helped to catapult him into fame and turned him into a local celebrity as a result of his performance in the show.

=== 2003–2004: Career debut and Star Academy ===
In May 2003, Lemarchal was involved in a musical entitled Adam and Eve, which was directed by Paul Tordjmann. Sponsored by Sony Music, AB Prod, Radio Scoop and Partouche, the production had ambitious plans to make a provincial tour, before a run at the Le Zénith in Paris. A total of 16 actors and dancers were involved in the production, with Lemarchal taking the lead role as Adam.

In 2004, Lemarchal gained international recognition after participating in the fourth season of the French reality singing competition Star Academy. Through the recommendation of a friend, he was contacted by the show's producers who needed another male contestant for the show. During his participation in the show, he had the opportunity to perform with French singers such as Yannick Noah, Michel Sardou and Patrick Bruel, and Italian tenor Andrea Bocelli. Lemarchal was announced as the winner of the season on 22 December 2004, beating fellow contestant Lucie Bernardoni with a massive vote of 80% to become the first male winner of the series.

=== 2005–2007: Je deviens moi and Olympia 06 ===
Lemarchal released his debut single, "Écris l'histoire", in March 2005; it peaked at number 2 in the French Singles Chart and was only held off the number 1 spot by Ilona Mitrecey's "Un Monde parfait". The single spent a total of 21 weeks in the chart and went platinum. Soon afterward, he released his highly anticipated first album, Je deviens moi, which debuted at number 1 and was certified platinum. The second single from the album was "Je suis en vie". It debuted at number 17 in the French Singles Chart, dropping to number 26 in its second week before climbing back to position number 21. The song remained in the charts for a total of 13 weeks. A third single, "À corps perdu", was less successful, with major French radio stations refusing to play it on account that it was "too sad".

At the NRJ Music Awards in January 2006, Lemarchal was awarded "Breakthrough Artist of the Year" ("Révélation francophone de l'année"). From May to June 2006, he completed his first solo nationwide tour across France, Belgium and Switzerland; a DVD of his performance, Olympia 06, was subsequently released. The first single from the album, "Même si (What You're Made of)" was very successful. The song was recorded by Lemarchal and the original singer of the song, Lucie Silvas, as a bilingual French-English version. The single debuted at number 2 in the French Singles Chart and was held off the number 1 spot by Pakito's "Living on Video". It spent a total of 26 weeks in the chart. A live version of the album track "Le feu sur les planches" was subsequently released.

=== 2007: Death ===
In 2007, Lemarchal announced that his health was deteriorating and that he had been ordered by doctors to take a few weeks off to recuperate. On the morning of 30 April 2007, at age 23, he died of complications while waiting in hospital for a lung transplant. His death made news headlines for an entire week, and more than five thousand fans arrived in Chambéry on the day of his funeral to pay their respects. A special television programme on 4 May 2007, "Grégory: La voix d'un ange", broadcast on TF1 to commemorate his life, reached an audience of more than 10.5 million viewers, and there was an appeal for donations to raise funds to fight cystic fibrosis and help progress research into finding a cure. To date, more than €7.5 million has been raised for cystic fibrosis causes in his memory.

A controversy emerged following his demise when Frédéric Martin, a comedian, was fined €4,000 including 2,000 in damages, to be paid to Lemarchal's family. When Martin gave a list of winners on national television he referred to Lemarchal only by the name of his illness without giving his name.

=== 2007–2009: Posthumous releases ===
A posthumous album, La voix d'un ange, was released a month and a half after his death by his record company Universal Music Group France, with profits going towards the Association Grégory Lemarchal. This release was not without controversy, for the record company was accused of cashing in on the public attention caused by his death. Despite the controversy the album was a success, topping both the French Digital and Album Charts in addition to the Belgian (Wallonia) Album Chart. The album was certified Platinum by the IFPI for sales of more than 1 million copies across Europe.

Three singles were released from the album. The song "De temps en temps" debuted at number 1 in both the French and Belgian (Wallonia) Singles Charts becoming Lemarchal's first number 1 single in those charts. The single dropped to number 2 in its second week, and went on to spend a total of 21 weeks on the chart. The success of the single eventually garnered him a posthumous award of Vincent Scotto by SACEM, the Society of Composers, Authors and Music Publishers of Canada. The third single, "Restons Amis" debuted at number 9 in French Singles Chart and stayed in the chart for a total of 16 weeks.

In November 2009, a compilation entitled Rêves was released, containing all Lemarchal's previous hit singles plus two unreleased songs. The album debuted at number 1 in France.

== Legacy ==
Logo of Grégory Lemarchal Association

- Grégory's family founded the Association Grégory Lemarchal on 7 June 2007. The organization is dedicated to improving the lives of cystic fibrosis sufferers and their families by providing information, funding research, and increasing public awareness of cystic fibrosis. The Association Grégory Lemarchal has funded many activities, including aid and assistance to patients and their families affected by cystic fibrosis with the purpose of improving their quality of life.
- Asteroid 213637 Lemarchal was named in his memory. The official naming citation was published by the Minor Planet Center on 23 September 2010 (M.P.C. 72202).

== Discography ==
Studio albums

- Je deviens moi (2005)
- La voix d'un ange (2007)

Live albums

- Olympia 06 (2006)
- Les pas d'un ange (2007)

Compilation albums

- Rêves (2009)
- Cinq ans (2012)

Preceded by Élodie Frégé	Winner of Star Academy France; 2005	Succeeded by Magalie Vaé
