= Écris l'histoire =

Single by Grégory Lemarchal

from the album Je deviens moi
- B-side: "SOS d'un terrien en détresse"
- Released: 29 March 2005
- Recorded: France
- Genre: Pop
- Length: 3:39
- Label: Universal
- Songwriter(s): Francesco de Benedittis; Paul Manners; Davide Esposito
- Producer(s): Yvan Cassar

Grégory Lemarchal singles chronology
"Écris l'histoire" (2005)	"Je suis en vie" (2005)

"Écris l'histoire" is the debut and most successful single from French singer Grégory Lemarchal. It was released in March 2005 in francophone countries as the first single from his album Je deviens moi, where it had a great success, particularly in France and Belgium (Wallonia).

== Background ==
The lyrics were written and the music composed by Francesco de Benedittis and Paul Manners. This song is actually a cover version of that of Italian singer Davide Esposito, "Io so che tu", but with other lyrics in French. Esposito's version, available on the CD single in an original and an unplugged versions, was charted from September 2006, peaking at number 71 in Switzerland and number 20 in France (it reentered the French chart at number 93 after Lemarchal's death, in May 2007).

== Chart performances ==
It entered at number two on the French SNEP Singles Chart on 2 April 2005. There it stayed for five consecutive weeks, and was unable to dislodge the smash hit "Un Monde parfait" by Ilona, which topped the chart then. Then it dropped on the chart, and totaled nine weeks in the top ten, 14 weeks in the top 50 and 21 weeks in the top 100. The single was certified Platinum disc by the SNEP, the French certifier, for 300,000 copies sold.

In Belgium (Wallonia), the single debuted at number seven on Ultratop 40 on 9 April 2005, and reached a peak at number two. It remained for ten weeks in the top ten and 16 weeks on the chart (top 40).

In Switzerland, the single entered the chart at number 43 on 10 April 2005. It climbed to a peak at number 18 the next week, and stayed on the chart for 18 weeks. On 20 May 2007, just after Lemarchal's death, it re-entered the chart at number 40 for one week.

In 2005, it was the 14th best-selling single in France, and the 13th in Belgium.

The song is also available on Lemarchal's posthumous compilation, Rêves.

It was covered by Liane Foly and Michael Jones for Les Enfoirés' 2006 album Le Village des Enfoirés and included in a medley named "Medley On s'écrit". It was also covered in 2011 by Claire Keim, Yannick Noah and Maurane on their album 2011: Dans l'œil des Enfoirés.

== Track listings ==
- CD single
1. "Écris l'histoire" (single version) — 3:39
2. "SOS d'un terrien en détresse" — 3:28
3. "Écris l'histoire" (instrumental version) — 3:38
- Digital download
1. "Écris l'histoire" — 3:39
2. "Écris l'histoire" (2006 live version) — 4:21

== Charts and sales ==
=== Peak positions ===
Chart (2005)	Peak position
Belgian (Wallonia) Singles Chart	2
Eurochart Hot 100 Singles	6
French Singles Chart	2
Swiss Singles Chart	18
Chart (2007)	Peak position
French Digital Chart	6

=== Year-end charts ===
Chart (2005)	Position
Belgian (Wallonia) Singles Chart	13
Europe (Eurochart Hot 100)	67
French Airplay Chart	75
French Singles Chart	14
French TV Airplay Chart	277

=== Certifications and sales ===
Region	Certification	Certified units/sales
France (SNEP)	Platinum	300,000^{*}
^{*} Sales figures based on certification alone.
