= Charlie Russell (producer) =

Charlie Russell is a music producer, songwriter and mixing engineer based at Dean Street Studios in London.

Russell has produced albums and tracks for Alt-J, Ho99o9, Wargasm, Jamiroquai, Robbie Williams, Kasabian, Chapel Club, Jake Bugg, The Strypes.

In 2002 Russell began working at Trevor Horn's at SARM West studios.
