= Paul Turner (bassist) =

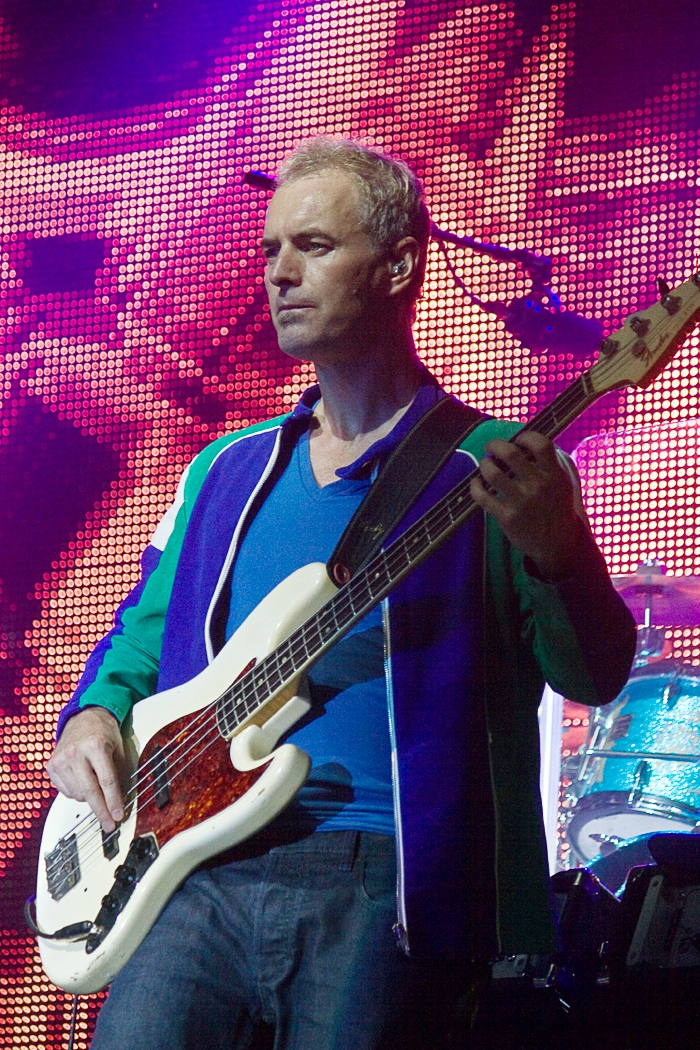
- Turner performing with Jamiroquai in 2011

Background information
- Born: 11 March 1968 (age 58); London, England
- Origin: Sunderland, England
- Genres: Funk; acid jazz; pop; rock; R&B; soul; dance; disco; reggae
- Occupations: Musician; songwriter
- Instrument: Bass
- Years active: 1987–present

Paul Turner (born 11 March 1968 in Sunderland) is an English musician who has been the bassist of the jazz-funk band Jamiroquai since 2005.

== Music career ==
Turner joined the jazz-funk band Jamiroquai in 2005 and has co-written, recorded and performed live with the band ever since. As well as Jamiroquai, he is known for playing with Annie Lennox over a number of years. He formed the soulful jazz-funk band Trioniq with Jamiroquai bandmate Rob Harris and Iwan VanHetten.

Other recording and/or live credits include Tina Turner, Bryan Ferry, Tom Jones, Seal and George Michael. In the 1990s, he was the live bassist for the boyband Take That.

He has played with a number of soul and R&B singers such as Omar, Lamont Dozier and Mica Paris, and jazz-funk names like Brother Strut, Down to the Bone and Jeff Lorber, plus a long list of UK pop bands as a recording musician and live performer.

=== Musical style and equipment ===
Turner mainly uses basses built by Tom Stenback or vintage Fenders including a 1966 Fender Jazz, 1963 Fender Precision and a number of similarly styled instruments. For amplification he used Aguilar amps and cabinets for a very long time, and recently switched to Trickfish (Bullhead 3K and 2x L410) that was used for the 2025 Jamiroquai tour.
