= Lucie Silvas =

British musician (born 1977)

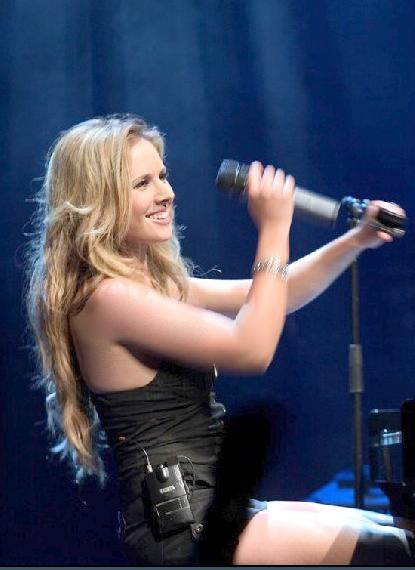
- Silvas performing in 2006

Background information
- Born: Lucie Joanne Silverman; 4 September 1977 (age 49); Kingston upon Thames, England
- Genres: Pop; Americana; country; roots
- Occupation: Musician
- Instruments: Vocals; piano; mandolin
- Years active: 1996–present
- Labels: Chrysalis, Mercury
- Website: luciesilvas.com

Lucie Joanne Silverman (born 4 September 1977), known professionally as Lucie Silvas, is a British singer-songwriter best known for her 2004 debut single "What You're Made Of", drawn from her first album Breathe In—itself a hit in the Netherlands, Spain and the United Kingdom.

== Early life ==
Silvas was born in Kingston upon Thames, England. Her father is from New Zealand and is of Jewish descent; and her mother is Scottish and is Christian.

Silvas learned to play piano at the age of 5, and had written her first song by age 10. She relocated many times between her parents' native countries as well as England.

== Career ==
=== 2000–02 ===
In 2000, Silvas signed to EMI Records. In June 2000, she released her debut single, "It's Too Late", which peaked at No. 62 in the UK Singles Chart. An album, entitled Forget Me Not, was also planned for release but EMI terminated her contract after the poor reception of the single.

In 2001, Chrysalis Records (an EMI subsidiary) contacted her, this time for songwriting. She signed a publishing contract and, despite being without a record label to release her music, she continued writing and had songs recorded and released by British artists including Sarah Whatmore, Will Young, Gareth Gates, Rachel Stevens and Liberty X. Several of Silvas' songs for other artists have become chart hits.

=== 2003–05: Breathe In ===
In 2003, Silvas recorded a duet with the Spanish singer Natalia called "This Time", and in 2004 she also wrote the first single off Natalia's third album, entitled "Sombras" (Shadows). The same year, Silvas also wrote "I'm Not Your Girlfriend" for the Spanish singer Cristie.

In 2003, Silvas signed a recording contract of her own with Mercury Records. She recorded her second album, Breathe In, which was to become her official debut album in October 2004. Produced by Mike Peden, much of Breathe In was co-written with Judie Tzuke, for whom Silvas sang backing vocals for many years. BBC Radio 2 commissioned a radio show to track Silvas' development in the music industry, supporting her career, and adding her tracks to their playlist. The first single from the album, What You're Made of, entered the official UK charts at number 7, and the following week the album debuted and peaked at number 11 (returning to this position in early 2005). Following TV appearances on the Ivor Novello Elton John tribute show, and "All Time Greatest Love Songs" with Ronan Keating, Silvas released her second single from the album, "Breathe In", which debuted at number 6, her highest UK chart peak to date. Silvas then released further singles; "The Game Is Won" and "Don't Look Back" which peaked at numbers 38 and 34 respectively.

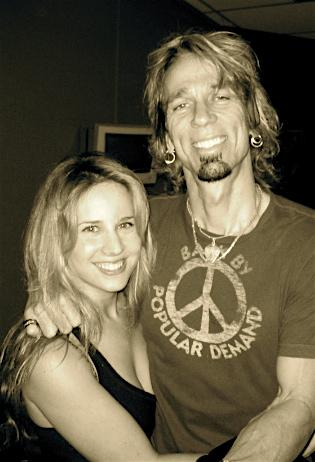
Lucie Silvas with Nashville producer, Trey Bruce, 2007

Following the release of the "Breathe In" single in Britain, Silvas took her music to Europe, including Germany and the Netherlands, where she released a special Europe-only single, "Nothing Else Matters", a cover of the Metallica song. The Breathe In album was also re-released in the Netherlands as a special 2-disc edition, featuring a full live concert recorded there. She also re-recorded "What You're Made Of" for the Spanish and French markets, working with Antonio Orozco and Grégory Lemarchal respectively. A special re-recorded version of the song, featuring the Metropole Orchestra, was released as the fourth and final single from the album in the Netherlands.

With Breathe In certified Platinum in the UK, Silvas embarked on her second UK tour starting in Brighton on 2 November 2005.

=== 2006–07: The Same Side ===
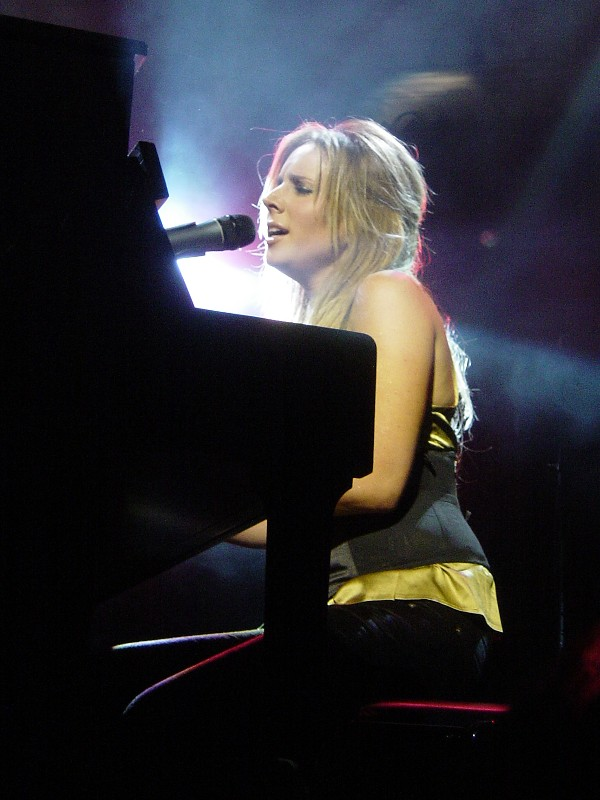
Lucie performing for her The Same Side album launch in 2006

Silvas's second album, The Same Side, was recorded in 2006. Produced by Danton Supple (who had produced Coldplay's X&Y album), it was released first in the Netherlands in October 2006. A duet with Marco Borsato, "Everytime I Think of You", was released as the first single in the Netherlands, charting at No. 35 on downloads only, and topping the Dutch Top 40 in the next 3 weeks, becoming her first Number 1 single. A DVD of The Same Side has also been released in the Netherlands.

"Last Year" was the first single from the album in the UK and Ireland, premiering on BBC Radio 2 in late August 2006, though it failed to chart. Following this setback, Mercury Records decided to postpone the UK release of the album, which had been scheduled for October 2006. A second single, "Sinking In", was released as a download only single on 5 March 2007 in the United Kingdom and Ireland, though this too failed to chart. The album was finally released in the UK on 12 March 2007, charting at No. 62 on the UK Albums Chart in its first week before falling out of the Top 100 the following week.

=== 2008–16: Letters to Ghosts ===
After The Same Side failed to impact on the charts, Silvas was subsequently dropped by her label. She has spent time working on new music in Nashville, Tennessee and New York City, as well as in studios in the UK. Several demos have been recorded and posted to various sites on the internet such as Silvas' official Myspace page. In August 2009, Silvas revealed that she was writing with Australian singer Delta Goodrem, and has also co-written tracks for Katharine McPhee's album Unbroken. In September 2009, Silvas also told fans on Twitter she was working on getting new material out in 2010 and was also planning a European tour. In February 2010, Silvas spent some time in the studio with Nadine Coyle of Girls Aloud.

In February 2011, Silvas revealed content from her then-forthcoming album, Letters to Ghosts. Tracks including "Happy", "Reset", "Smoke (Somebody Stop Me)" and "Roots" – the last of which was offered as a free download prior to the album's release through SoundCloud in April 2011. She has also supported Jamiroquai on their 2011 tour. On 8 June 2011, Silvas then posted that she had finished recording her album.

In July 2011, Silvas worked on some new songs with Una Healy of The Saturdays on a song called "Last Call", written by Silvas, Healy and Chris Holmes that featured on The Saturdays' album On Your Radar.

In early 2013 Silvas wrote songs for NBC's musical drama, Smash. Her songs, including "Heart Shaped Wreckage", "Pretender", "Don't Let Me Know" and "Calling Out My Name", appear in Hit List, a staged concert based on the fictional musical created for that show's second season.

In 2014, Silvas sang "Little Civil Wars", a duet with Dave Barnes, on his Golden Days project.

On 3 February 2015, Lucie released her self-titled EP in the US and Canada, just before its release in Europe. Produced by Silvas, John Osborne and Ian Fitchuk, the new album is released on Silvas' own label, "Furthestpoint", via Caroline Records.

Letters to Ghosts was officially released on 18 September 2015. Silvas co-wrote the song "Smoking Jacket" and provides backing vocals for Miranda Lambert on her 2016 album, The Weight of These Wings.

=== 2017–present: E.G.O. ===
Silvas performed at the O2 Arena in March 2017 as part of the C2C: Country to Country festival and debuted two new songs, "Just for the Record" and "My Old Habits", before revealing that new music would be released in 2018.

On 31 May 2018, Silvas announced her fourth studio album, E.G.O., and released the lead single, "Kite", the same day. The album was released on 24 August 2018.

== Personal life ==
In 2015, Silvas married John Osborne, of the country duo Brothers Osborne. Osborne announced at the 56th Annual Country Music Association Awards in 2022 that Silvas was pregnant with twins. Her twins, a boy and girl, were born in March 2023.

== Discography ==
- Breathe In (2004)
- The Same Side (2006)
- Letters to Ghosts (2015)
- E.G.O. (2018)
