= Hoberman =

Hoberman is a surname. Notable people with the surname include:

- Ben Hoberman (1922–2014), American radio executive
- Brent Hoberman (born 1968), British entrepreneur and investor
- Chuck Hoberman (born 1956), American designer and architect
- David Hoberman (born 1952), American film producer
- Gary Hoberman (born 1972),

American entrepreneur and technologist

- Haggai Hoberman (born 1959), Israeli journalist and author
- J. Hoberman (born 1949), American film critic
- John Hoberman, Professor of Germanic languages at the University of Texas at Austin
- Mary Ann Hoberman (born 1930), American writer
- Nicky Hoberman (born 1967), South African artist
- Perry Hoberman (born 1954), American artist

== See also ==
- Hoberman Arch
- Hoberman sphere
