= Peristaltic robot =

Peristaltic robot based on earthworm

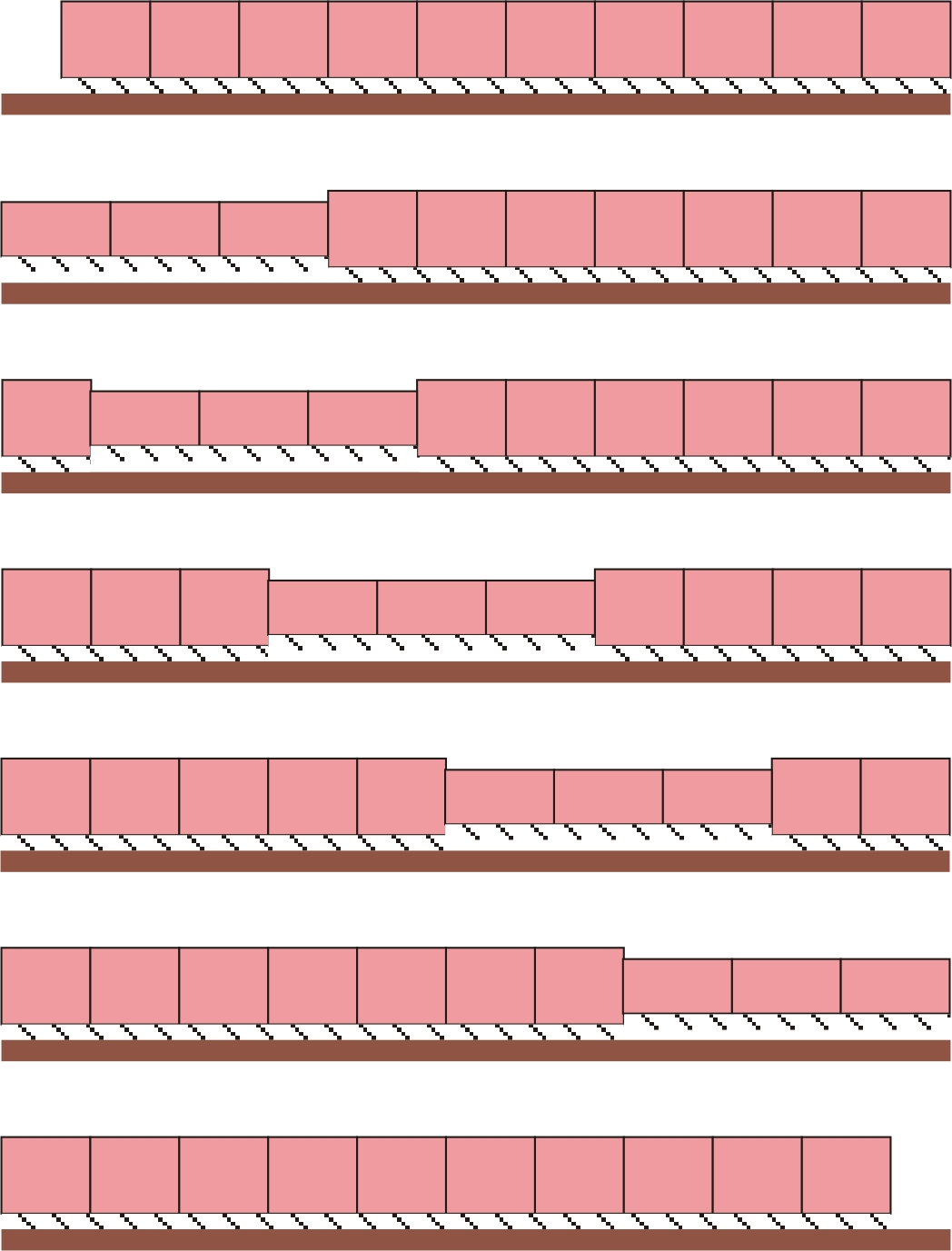
Peristaltic locomotion of the earthworm represented by contractions and expansions of the body segments

A peristaltic robot, also known as a worm-bot, is a robot that uses peristaltic locomotion to move, mimicking the movement of earthworms. Peristaltic locomotion relies on compressions and expansions of the metameres, or body segments, of earthworms. This method of movement is especially effective in navigating through narrow and intricate surfaces, making it particularly suitable for small millimeter-scale robots. Peristaltic robots have a wide range of applications, including endoscopy, mining operations, and pipe inspections.

== Soft and Rigid robots ==
Peristaltic worm bots can be categorized as either soft or rigid robots, depending on the materials used in their construction and actuation. Soft robots are typically made of highly deformable intrinsic materials, such as silicone and rubber. These robots are capable of producing continuous, multimodal deformations, making them suitable for navigating complex mechanisms. Additionally, soft robots are often more human-friendly than their rigid counterparts.

Rigid robots, in contrast, are made from materials like acrylic plates, rigid skeletons, and spring steel belts. These robots are easily manufactured and controlled, and can be assembled with any type of actuator, making them more cost-effective than soft robots.

Both soft and rigid peristaltic worm bots have unique advantages and disadvantages, and the choice of which type to use depends on the specific needs and requirements of the application.

== Actuation ==
Worm-bots are powered by various actuators depending on the work environment. These technologies generate the motion power along with bi-directional force in a single actuator system, enabling them to actuate each part independently, like an earthworm. The commonly used actuation technologies are as follows:

=== Pneumatic actuators ===
Pneumatic actuators are most commonly used to generate peristaltic locomotion in worm robots due to their ease of manufacturing, response speed and highforce generation.

When multiple pneumatic actuators are used, the additional requirement of pumps making it more complicated to control the robot. Pneumatic actuators also restrict the ability to create complex and untethered robots.

=== Shape memory alloy actuators (SMA) ===
Shape memory alloys are the materials that are able to memorize and recover to its original shape after significant deformations from heating or applying load and stress. NiTi, CuZnAl and CuAlNi are some of the most common materials used for SMA's. The shape memory alloys are extremely sensitive to the changes in their composition and grain size, even the small changes can drastically alter their properties.

When the spring made from SMA material is subjected to heat by induced voltage, the segment of the robot contracts and the spring expands to reshape to its original form when the voltage is cut off. These cycle of contractions and expansions generate a peristaltic wave. Shape memory alloys are used to generate the peristaltic locomotion due to their low operating noise and low actuation voltage.

=== Origami based actuation ===
An example of building 3D structure from 2D sheet using origami folding techniques

Origami is an art of folding the 2D sheet in a prescribed way to create complex 3D structures. This technology is used in multiple industries to create reconfigurable robots, mechanical materials and deployable structures. These origami components are lightweight, compact, compliant and have properties such as multistability, programmable non-linear stiffness and multi stability due to the non linear folding kinematics. The multi-stability in origami is used to replace the requirement of multiple actuators and digital controllers required to generate the complex peristaltic locomotion.

The Yoshimura-ori is one of the style or method of folding mechanism of a 2D structure. Using the Yoshimura-ori structure along with shape memory alloy actuators enables the 3D spatial locomotion to be achieved in earthworm bot. This is the only robot capable of generating 3D motion in worm-bots.

=== Magnetic fluid actuation ===
Magnetic fluid actuation is one type of actuator used to generate peristaltic locomotion. Magnetic fluid changes its viscosity based on changes in the magnetic field. The body of the robot is made up of soft rubber tubes filled with magnetic fluid and the magnetic field around the robot is altered using a permanent magnet.

Magnetic fluid can also be used to control the direction of the robot. The permanent magnet is placed on the head of the robot, and the magnetic field is used to change the course of the robot as it is moving. These robots can be made autonomous when introduced with magnetic field induced with feedback control.

=== Other type of actuators ===
Apart from the mentioned most commonly used actuators, several other actuators based on servomotors, pneumatic ballon, peristaltic soft actuator (PSA). Peristaltic soft actuator works based on the pressure change in the fluidic chambers of the robot.

== Fabrication ==
When designing robots that mimic the earthworm's movement, various chambers are incorporated to withstand active reshaping caused by compressions and expansions. To ensure these deformations can be handled, body segments are typically made of soft materials such as natural rubber, silicone, ABS, and other polymers, depending on the specific application of the robot. Additive manufacturing techniques, such as 3D printing, are commonly used to construct the majority of these models, resulting in cost-effective, fast, and resilient robots.

The length of the robot's body plays a crucial role in determining its efficiency, speed, and waveform. For instance, a robot with fewer body segments can move faster but may have limited carrying capacity, limiting its potential applications.

== Control of the robot ==
Controlling peristaltic robots can be a complex task, especially with millimeter-scale robots, where installing controllers and sensors can be challenging. Nonetheless, researchers have developed several prototype robots that incorporate innovative technologies, such as servomotors, artificial skin, magnetic fields, hydraulic fluids, and pneumatic controllers.

The earthworm's locomotion is primarily depends on the friction between their bodies and the surface they move on. The direction of peristaltic robots can be controlled by modifying the friction at the head and tail of the robot. To emulate the earthworm's active-passive mechanism of locomotion, one robot was designed to actively vary friction coefficients by adjusting the surface of contact with external actuators during sliding.

=== Slippage ===
During the peristaltic cycle, whether in the contraction or elongation phase, the earthworm's body tends to slip backward. To prevent this, the earthworm's body is equipped with hair-like structures called setae, which act as anchors and provide enough friction to move the whole body forward. Similarly, robots also experience slippage during the contraction and expansion phase, which significantly reduces their crawling efficiency and should be avoided as much as possible in actual movement.

To reduce slip in robots, either waveform control or the forced contact method can be used. With waveform control, a feedback loop can be used to achieve a slipped sine wave, which is effective in constant radius pipes.Non-periodic waveform can also be employed to reduce slippage by creating more than one wave, which reorients the body within shorter intervels of time.

== Applications ==
Peristaltic soft robots have a range of potential applications, including infrastructural pipe inspection and maintenance due to their capability of 90-degree vertical ascents. These robots have significant military applications such as tunnel burrowing and search and rescue missions for those trapped under avalanches. The combination of peristaltic robots with material removal tools has potential uses in planetary excavation applications. In the medical field, these robots are used for gastrointestinal tract inspection and endoscopic inspections. Soft, flexible robots that require minimal space for locomotion are highly suitable for these applications, making peristaltic robots an ideal choice.
