= Telescopic cylinder =

Extending boom design

Telescopic cylinders are a special design of a hydraulic cylinder or pneumatic cylinder as well as pulley system which provide an exceptionally long output travel from a very compact retracted length. Typically the collapsed length of a telescopic cylinder is 20 to 40% of the fully extended length depending on the number of stages. Some pneumatic telescoping units are manufactured with retracted lengths of under 15% of overall extended unit length. This feature is very attractive to machine design engineers when a conventional single stage rod style actuator will not fit in an application to produce the required output stroke.

Telescopic cylinder (ISO 1219 symbol)

Heavy duty telescopic cylinders are usually powered by oil hydraulics, whereas some lighter duty units could also be powered by compressed air.

Telescopic cylinders are also referred to as telescoping cylinders and multi-stage telescopic cylinders.

An application for telescopic cylinders commonly seen is that of the dump body on a dump truck used in a construction site. In order to empty the load of gravel completely, the dump body must be raised to an angle of about 60 degrees. To accomplish this long travel with a conventional hydraulic cylinder is very difficult considering that the collapsed length of a single stage rod cylinder is approximately 110% of its output stroke. It would be very challenging for the design engineer to fit the single stage cylinder into the chassis of the dump truck with the dump body in the horizontal rest position. This task is easily accomplished, however, using a telescopic style multi-stage cylinder.

== Design and technical terminology ==
Showing the telescopic principle, an object collapsed (top) and extended (bottom), providing more reach.

Telescopic cylinders are designed with a series of steel or aluminum tubes of progressively smaller diameters nested within each other. The largest diameter sleeve is called the main or barrel. The smaller inner sleeves are called the stages. The smallest stage is often called the plunger or piston rod.

The cylinders are usually mounted in machinery by pivot mounts welded to the end or outer body of the barrel as well as on the end of the plunger.

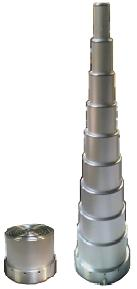
pneumatic telescoping cylinder, 8-stages, single-acting, retracted and extended

Telescopic cylinders are commonly restricted to a maximum of 6 stages. 6 stages are commonly thought to be the practical design limit as stability problems become more difficult with larger numbers of stages. There are exceptions however, with one pneumatic cylinder manufacturer successfully incorporating up to 9 stages in their cylinder designs.

Telescopic cylinders require careful design as they are subjected to large side forces especially at full extension. The weight of the steel bodies and the hydraulic oil contained within the actuator create moment loads on the bearing surfaces between stages. These forces, combined with the load being pushed, threaten to bind or even buckle the telescopic assembly. Sufficient bearing surfaces must therefore be incorporated in the design of the actuator to prevent failure in service due to side forces. Telescopic cylinders must only be used in machinery as a device for providing force and travel. Side forces and moment loads must be minimized. Telescopic cylinders should not be used to stabilize a structural component.

Hydraulic telescopic cylinders are often limited to a maximum hydraulic pressure of 2000-3000 psi. This is because the outward forces produced by internal hydraulic pressure tends to expand the steel sleeve sections. Too much pressure will cause the nested sleeves to balloon outward, bind the mechanism and stop moving. The danger exists that a permanent deformation of the outer diameter of a sleeve could occur, thus ruining a telescopic actuator. For this reason, care must be taken to avoid shock pressures in a hydraulic system using telescopic cylinders. Often such hydraulic systems are equipped with shock suppressing components, such as hydraulic accumulators, to absorb pressure spikes.

== Basic design types of telescopic cylinders ==
Telescopic cylinders can usually be classified into two basic designs: single acting and double acting. A number of other special designs also exist including a hybrid single/double acting design, and a constant speed, constant thrust design.

=== Single-acting ===
Single acting telescopic cylinders are the simplest and most common design. As with a single acting rod style cylinder, the single acting telescopic cylinder is extended using hydraulic or pneumatic pressure but retracts using external forces when the fluid medium is removed and relieved to the reservoir. This external retraction force is usually gravity acting on the weight of the load. This external weight must obviously be sufficient to overcome the friction and mechanical losses within the machine design even after the work portion of the machine cycle has been accomplished. In the example above of the dump truck, the weight of the dump body, now raised at an angle of 60 degrees but empty of the load, must be enough to force the unpressurized hydraulic fluid out of the cylinder and cause it to retract to the fully collapsed position.

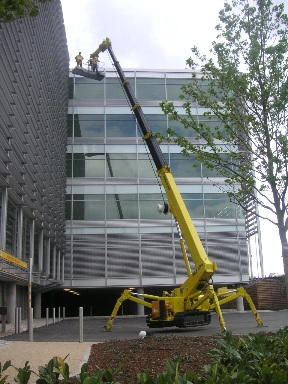
Spider lift set up outside a building. This aerial platform vehicle uses a telescopic hydraulic cylinder to extend the platform

=== Double-acting ===
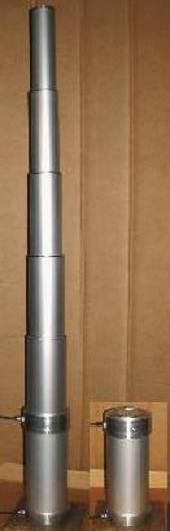
Pneumatic telescoping cylinder 5-stage, double-acting, demonstrating full extension and retraction

A double acting cylinder is extended and retracted using hydraulic or pneumatic pressure in both directions. Double acting telescopic cylinders are thus much more complex in design than the single acting type. This additional complexity is due to the requirement of adding retracting piston faces to all of the cylinder stages and the difficulty in supplying pressurized fluid to the retraction pistons of the intermediate stages.

To accomplish the double acting feature, additional hydraulic seals are added to internally seal off the individual stages. In addition, internal air or oil passageways are machined so that as each stage completes retracting, a passage is open to supply the next stage with pressurized fluid to retract. Thus a double acting telescopic actuator usually retracts starting from the smallest diameter stage to finish with the largest stage retracting lastly. Because the seals used to accomplish this must pass over these internally machined fluid transfer holes, the seals are usually made from hard materials to resist wear and abrasion. They are often iron rings or glass reinforced nylon seals.

The extension and retraction fluid supply ports on double acting hydraulic telescopic cylinders are usually located at opposite ends of the cylinder assembly. The extension port is mounted at the base of the outer barrel and the retraction port is mounted in the end of the plunger section. This can, in some applications, prove to be very difficult to connect with hydraulic hoses due to the distance between these ports at full extension. In such a circumstance, both ports can be located in the barrel. An internal passageway must be fitted, however, so that the retracting fluid is supplied to the plunger section at full extension. This special passageway is in itself a telescopic assembly that extends with the cylinder and is outfitted with seals on the various stages.

This additional complexity makes double acting telescopic cylinders very expensive. They are usually custom designed for each application.

Typical applications for double acting telescopic cylinders include the packer-ejector cylinders in garbage trucks and transfer trailers, horizontal compactors, telescopic excavator shovels, and roll-on/roll-off trucks. In all of these applications, the cylinder operates near horizontally and thus gravity is not available to retract the actuator. A double acting design is therefore required to both push and pull the telescoping mechanism.

Care must be taken when controlling most double acting telescopic design cylinders. The effective retraction area is often much less than the extension area. Thus if the hydraulic fluid return line is blocked during extension a pressure intensifying effect can occur causing seal failure or even causing the metal sleeve to balloon outward. The cylinder could thus be rendered unable to retract because of failed seals or jam in position due to binding.

Another problem can occur if a double acting telescopic cylinder encounters a load that pulls on the actuator during extension such as when a tilting load goes over center and opens the cylinder beyond the internal volume of the hydraulic oil. When the piston face catches up again and strikes the oil column a pressure spike occurs which can damage the actuator.

=== Single- / double-acting combination ===
In some applications, a single acting telescopic cylinder is adequate to accomplish the work except for one stage that is required to be double acting.

An example of this is erecting the mast of a large mobile drilling rig. The mast is erected to the vertical position using a telescopic cylinder. However, to lower the mast, gravity is not available for the initial tilt back from the vertical position. Thus, the plunger stage only of the telescopic actuator is equipped as a double acting cylinder to provide the initial force to pull the mast back from vertical. Once the tilt back has been initiated, then gravity takes over and supplies the force to complete the full cylinder retraction. The remaining stages, therefore, are single acting. This special combination is much less complex and much less costly than using an entirely double acting design.

=== Constant thrust, constant speed ===
In some special applications, a telescopic cylinder is required to extend with a constant force or constant speed. To accomplish this the cylinder is designed so that all the stages extend at the same time. This can also be accomplished in a double acting design by matching the extension and retraction areas of the pistons on all the stages.

== See also ==
- Scissors mechanism
- Linear actuator
