= You Read to Me, I'll Read to You =

Very Short Mother Goose Tales to Read Together
- Front cover, designed by M. Emberley
- Author: Mary Ann Hoberman
- Original title: None
- Translator: None
- Illustrator: Michael Emberley
- Cover artist: M. Emberley
- Language: English
- Series: You Read to Me, I'll Read to You
- Genre: Nursery rhymes, Children's literature, picture book, Poetry
- Published: 2004 (Little, Brown and Company)
- Publication place: United States
- Media type: Print (Paperback)
- Pages: 32
- ISBN: 978-0-316-14431-5
- Preceded by: Very Short Fairy Tales to Read Together
- Followed by: Very Short Scary Tales to Read Together

You Read to Me, I'll Read to You is a series of books written by Mary Ann Hoberman and illustrated by Michael Emberley, published by Little Brown and Company.

You Read to Me, I'll Read to You: Very Short Stories to Read Together was published in 2001.

You Read to Me, I'll Read to You: Very Short Fairy Tales to Read Together was published in 2004.

You Read to Me, I'll Read to You: Very Short Mother Goose Tales to Read Together is the third book in the series. It was published in 2004.

You Read to Me, I'll Read to You: Very Short Scary Tales to Read Together was published in 2007.

You Read to Me, I’ll Read to You: Very Short Fables to Read Together was published in 2010.

== Book summaries ==
The third book retells nursery rhymes such as Humpty Dumpty chatting with his doctor and Little Miss Muffet explaining 'curds and whey' to the spider. Other rhymes include Old Mother Hubbard, Peter Peter Pumpkin Eater, Simple Simon, and Baa, Baa, Black Sheep.

== Reception ==
It was reviewed by Horn Book Magazine.

Kirkus Reviews described the 2001 book as entertaining. Citing a "monotonous" tone and a "rhyme scan" that is almost the same throughout the book, Publishers Weekly argued that, in the 2001 book, "the text never really takes flight."

A Book Loons review says, "I love this series - enjoy reading the rhymes separately and together, in chorus. Very Short Mother Goose Tales to Read Together take off from the familiar originals in all kinds of entertaining new directions". A Reading Tub review stated, "The collection brings some nursery rhymes up to current times and adds some surprising endings to them all. There is all-round utility, whether in a classroom or at home".

== See also ==
- Mother Goose
- Mary Ann Hoberman
