= Forget-Me-Nots: Poems to Learn by Heart =

2012 collection of poems compiled by Mary Ann Hoberman

Forget-Me-Nots: Poems to Learn by Heart is a collection of poems compiled by Mary Ann Hoberman, with illustration work by Michael Emberley. It was published in 2012 by Little, Brown.

Hoberman did not write the poems, but she chose which ones would be in the book. The works were made by 57 poets. Some of the poets catered to children while others had catered to adults in their careers. The book has a range of poems with different difficulty levels and lengths.

Watercolor paints, pastels, and pencils were used to make the illustrations.

The book gives advice to children on how to more easily memorize poems so they can be repeated without looking at the written work. The advice is at the end of the book.

== Reception ==
Publishers Weekly gave the work a starred review, and stated that the work was "multidimensional and thoughtful".

Deborah Stevenson, the editor of Bulletin of the Center for Children's Books, wrote that the reason for the book is "noble", that it is "a pretty delicious assortment in general", that the introduction was "thoughtful", and that the illustrations were "an unassuming wonder".

Susan Dove Lempke, in The Horn Book, wrote that the book is good for a general audience of children and for "poetry lovers".

Carolyn Phelan, in Booklist, stated that the work is "handsome" and that the illustrations are "appealing".

Pamela Paul, in The New York Times, wrote that the poems by Edna St. Vincent Millay were "rather long, intimidating examples".

Amy E. Parker, who worked as a librarian for The Kinkaid School, stated that she recommended the book in a review published by Library Media Connection.

Kirkus Reviews stated that despite it having a lot of ambition, the work overall was "sadly forgettable", and that it was "oversized".
