= Hydraulic cylinder =

Mechanical tool for applying force

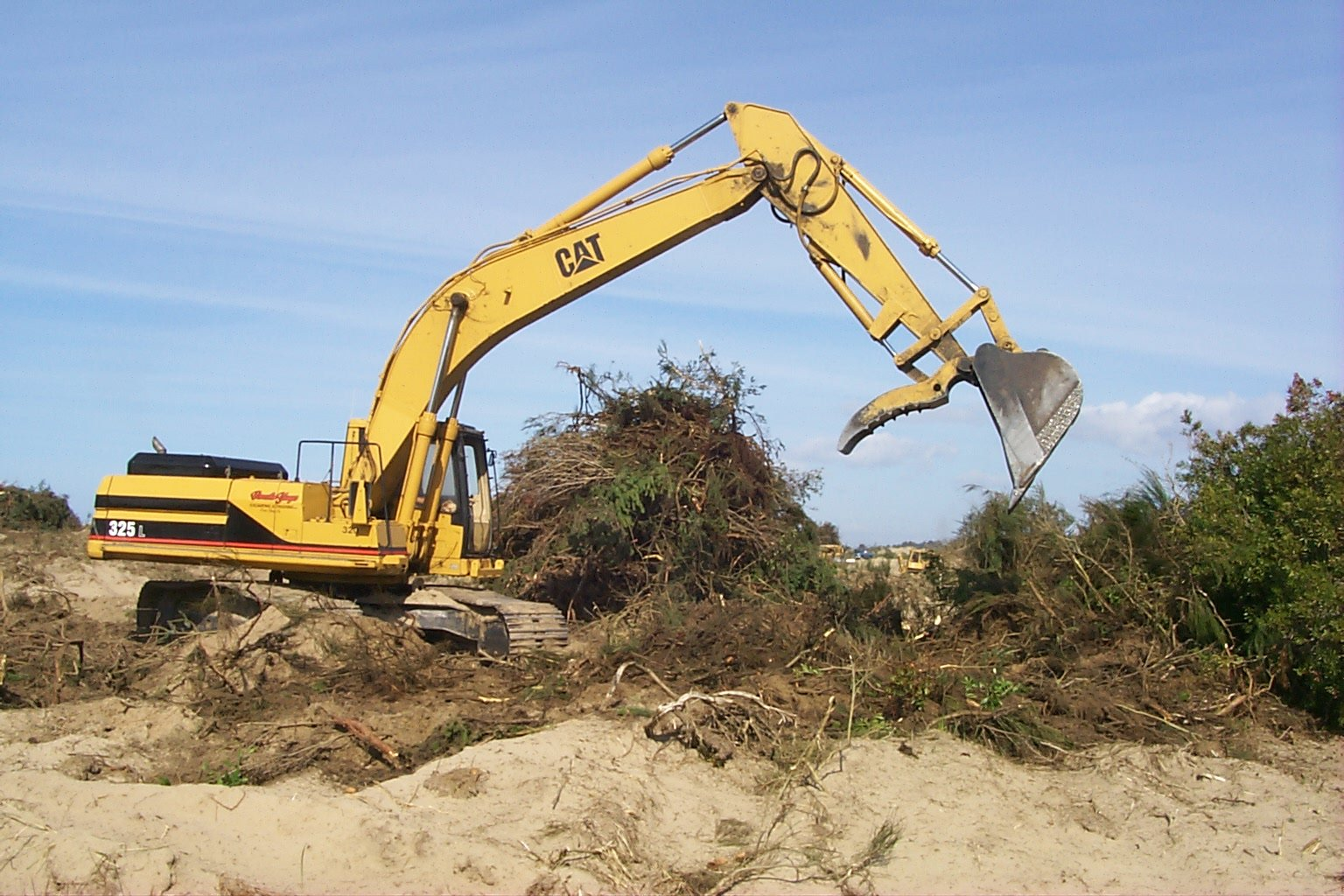
The hydraulic cylinders on this excavator operate the machine's linkages.

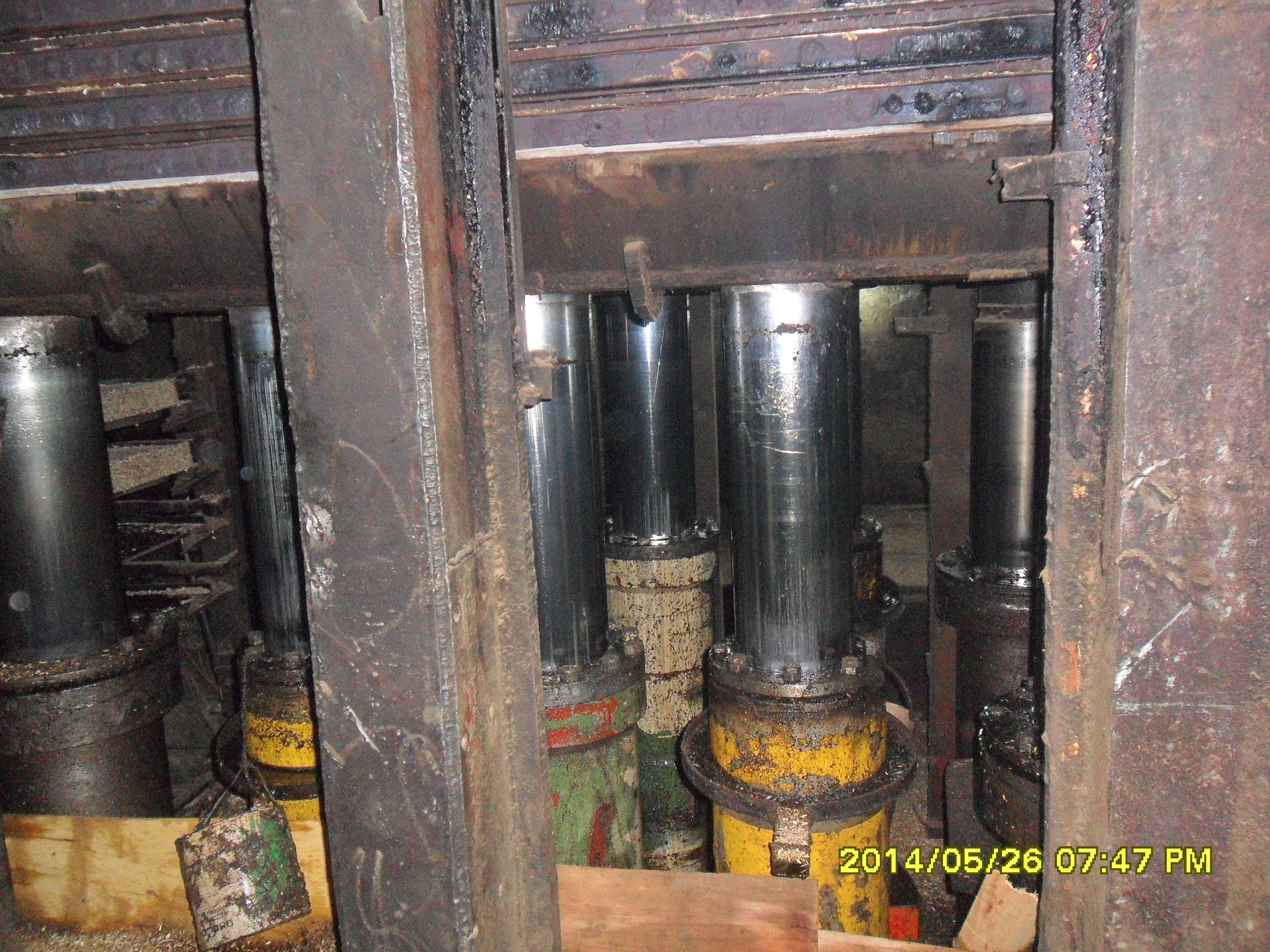
Hydraulic cylinders in a hot press of a particle board machine

A hydraulic cylinder (also called a linear hydraulic motor, hydraulic actuator, or hydraulic ram) is a mechanical actuator that is used to convert fluid pressure into linear force and motion. It has many applications, notably in construction equipment (engineering vehicles), manufacturing machinery, elevators, and civil engineering. A hydraulic cylinder is a hydraulic actuator that provides linear motion when hydraulic energy is converted into mechanical movement. It can be likened to a muscle in that, when the hydraulic system of a machine is activated, the cylinder is responsible for providing the motion.

== Operation ==
Hydraulic cylinders are powered from pressurized hydraulic fluid, which is incompressible. Typically oil is used as hydraulic fluid. The hydraulic cylinder consists of a cylinder barrel, in which a piston connected to a piston rod moves back and forth. The barrel is closed on one end by the cylinder bottom (also called the cap) and the other end by the cylinder head (also called the gland) where the piston rod comes out of the cylinder. The piston has sliding rings and seals. The piston divides the inside of the cylinder into two chambers, the bottom chamber (cap end) and the piston rod side chamber (rod end/head-end).

Flanges, trunnions, clevises, and lugs are common cylinder mounting end options. The piston rod also has mounting attachments to connect the cylinder to the object or machine component that it is pushing or pulling.

A hydraulic cylinder is the actuator or "motor" side of this system. The "generator" side of the hydraulic system is the hydraulic pump which pressurizes and delivers a fixed or regulated flow of oil to the hydraulic cylinder, to move the piston. Typically, hydraulic pumps generate power by various energy sources: hand, air, and electric motor, or engine. The piston pushes the oil in the other chamber back to the reservoir. If we assume oil enters the cap end during an extension stroke, zero friction, and the oil pressure in the rod end/head end is approximately zero, force F on the piston rod equals the pressure P in the cylinder times the piston area A:

$$F = P \cdot A$$

Actual force measured during piston rod movement may exceed the calculated force by 20% or more due to friction created by seals and mounting end bushings.

Hydraulic cylinder pistons rods are typically sized according to the force, including friction losses, needed to move a load, while avoiding piston rod buckling load, as can be assessed by ANSI T3.6.37 or ISO/TS 13725. To prevent the creation of force in excess of the piston rod buckling load by the hydraulic fluid, a hydraulic fluid relief valve in the hydraulic circuit of the cylinder can be set to relieve at a pressure below the buckling load pressure, assuming the relief valve can expel the hydraulic fluid accordingly.

Shearing forces at the connection between the piston rod and mounting end or at the hydraulic cylinder base is another factor to consider when determining hydraulic cylinder reliability.

=== Retraction force difference ===
For double-acting single-rod cylinders, when the input and output pressures are reversed, there is a force difference between the two sides of the piston due to one side of the piston being covered by the rod attached to it. The cylinder rod reduces the surface area of the piston and reduces the force that can be applied for the retraction stroke.

During the retraction stroke, if the oil is pumped into the head (or gland) at the rod end and the oil from the cap end flows back to the reservoir without pressure, the fluid pressure in the rod end is (Pull Force) / (piston area - piston rod area):

$$P = \frac{F_p}{A_p - A_r}$$

where P is the fluid pressure, F_{p} is the pulling force, A_{p} is the piston face area and A_{r} is the rod cross-section area.

For double-acting, double-rod cylinders, when the piston surface area is equally covered by a rod of equal size on both sides of the head, there is no force difference. Such cylinders typically have their cylinder body affixed to a stationary mount.

== Applications ==
Hydraulic cylinders can be used in any machine where high forces are required, one of the most familiar being earth-moving equipment such as excavators, back hoes and tractors to lift or lower the boom, arm, or bucket. Manufacturing is another popular application where they can be found in hydraulic bending machines, metal sheet shearing machines, particle board or plywood making hot press.

== Parts ==
A hydraulic cylinder has the following parts:

=== Cylinder barrel ===
A hydraulic cylinder barrel is the main, high-strength tubular body of a hydraulic actuator that houses the piston, rod, and seals. It acts as a pressure vessel containing high-pressure fluid, typically manufactured from honed seamless steel tubes to provide a wear-resistant interior surface for smooth piston movement and seal efficiency.

=== Cylinder base or cap ===
The main function of the cap is to enclose the pressure chamber at one end. The cap is connected to the body by means of welding, threading, bolts, or tie rods. Caps also perform as cylinder mounting components [cap flange, cap trunnion, cap clevis]. Capsize is determined based on the bending stress. A static seal / o-ring is used in between cap and barrel (except welded construction).

=== Cylinder head ===
The main function of the head is to enclose the pressure chamber from the other end. The head contains an integrated rod sealing arrangement or the option to accept a seal gland. The head is connected to the body by means of threading, bolts, or tie rods. A static seal / o-ring is used in between head and barrel.

=== Piston ===
The main function of the piston is to separate the pressure zones inside the barrel. The piston is machined with grooves to fit elastomeric or metal seals and bearing elements. These seals can be single-acting or double-acting. The difference in pressure between the two sides of the piston causes the cylinder to extend and retract. The piston is attached to the piston rod by means of threads, bolts, or nuts to transfer the linear motion.

=== Piston rod ===
The piston rod is typically a hard chrome-plated piece of cold-rolled steel that attaches to the piston and extends from the cylinder through the rod-end head. In double rod-end cylinders, the actuator has a rod extending from both sides of the piston and out both ends of the barrel. The piston rod connects the hydraulic actuator to the machine component doing the work. This connection can be in the form of a machine thread or a mounting attachment. The piston rod is highly ground and polished to provide a reliable seal and prevent leakage.

=== Seal gland ===
The cylinder head is fitted with seals to prevent the pressurized oil from leaking past the interface between the rod and the head. This area is called the seal gland. The advantage of a seal gland is easy removal and seal replacement. The seal gland contains a primary seal, a secondary seal/buffer seal, bearing elements, a wiper/scraper, and a static seal. In some cases, especially in small hydraulic cylinders, the rod gland and the bearing elements are made from a single integral machined part.

=== Seals ===
The seals are considered/designed to withstand maximum cylinder working pressure, cylinder speed, operating temperature, working medium, and application. Piston seals are dynamic seals, and they can be single-acting or double-acting. Generally speaking, Elastomer seals made from nitrile rubber, Polyurethane, or other materials are best in lower temperature environments, while seals made of Fluorocarbon Viton are better for higher temperatures. Metallic seals are also available and commonly used cast iron for the seal material. Rod seals are dynamic seals and generally are single-acting. The compounds of rod seals are nitrile rubber, Polyurethane, or Fluorocarbon Viton. Wipers/scrapers are used to eliminate contaminants such as moisture, dirt, and dust, which can cause extensive damage to cylinder walls, rods, seals, and other components. The common compound for wipers is polyurethane. Metallic scrapers are used for sub-zero temperature applications and applications where foreign materials can deposit on the rod. The bearing elements/wear bands are used to eliminate metal to metal contact. The wear bands are designed to withstand maximum side loads. The primary compounds used for wear bands are filled PTFE, woven fabric reinforced polyester resin, and bronze.

=== Other parts ===
There are many component parts that make up the internal portion of a hydraulic cylinder. All of these pieces combine to create a fully functioning component.

- Cylinder base connection
- Cushions
- Internal Threaded Ductile Heads
- Head Glands
- Polypak Pistons
- Cylinder Head Caps
- Butt Plates
- Eye Brackets/Clevis Brackets
- MP Detachable Mounts
- Rod Eyes/Rod Clevis
- Pivot Pins
- Spherical Ball Bushings
- Spherical Rod Eye
- Alignment Coupler
- Ports and Fittings

=== Single acting vs. double acting ===
- Single-acting cylinders are economical and the simplest design. Hydraulic fluid enters through a port at one end of the cylinder, which extends the rod by means of area difference. An external force, retraction spring(internal or external) or gravity, returns the piston rod.
- Double acting cylinders have a port at each end or side of the piston, supplied with hydraulic fluid for both the retraction and extension of the piston rod.

== Designs ==
There are primarily two main styles of hydraulic cylinder construction used in the industry: tie rod-style cylinders and welded body-style cylinders.

=== Tie rod cylinder ===
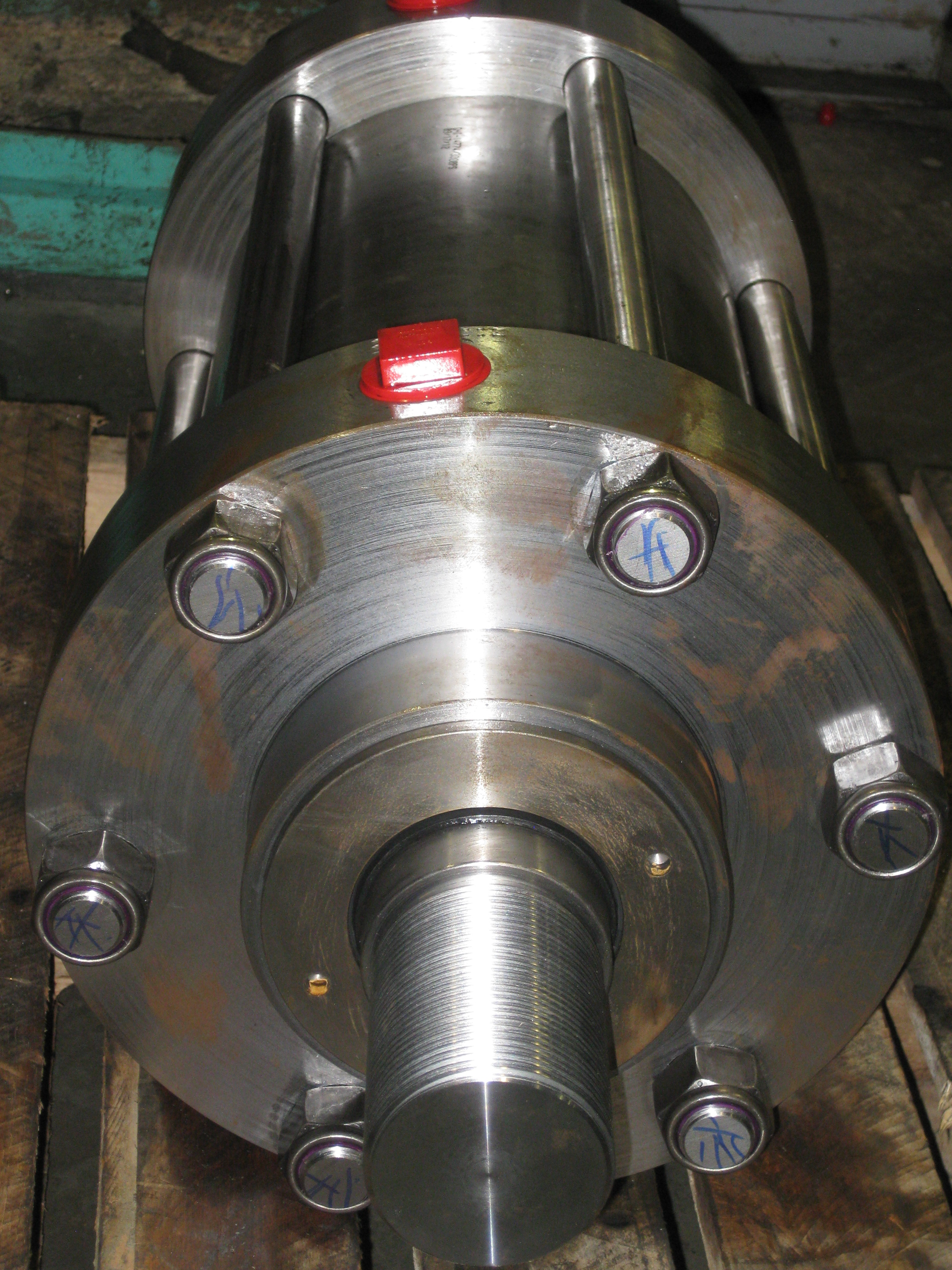
A tie rod cylinder

Tie rod style hydraulic cylinders use high strength threaded steel rods to hold the two end caps to the cylinder barrel. They are most often seen in industrial factory applications. Small-bore cylinders usually have 4 tie rods, and large bore cylinders may require as many as 16 or 20 tie rods to retain the end caps under the tremendous forces produced. Tie rod style cylinders can be completely disassembled for service and repair, and they are not always customizable.

The National Fluid Power Association (NFPA) has standardized the dimensions of hydraulic tie-rod cylinders. This enables cylinders from different manufacturers to interchange within the same mountings.

=== Welded body cylinder ===
Welded body cylinders have no tie rods. The barrel is welded directly to the end caps. The ports are welded to the barrel. The front rod gland is usually threaded into or bolted to the cylinder barrel, allowing for the piston rod assembly and the rod seals to be removed for service.

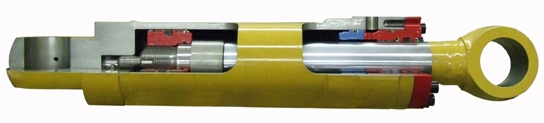
A Cut Away of a Welded Body Hydraulic Cylinder showing the internal components

Welded body cylinders have a number of advantages over tie rod-style cylinders. Welded cylinders have a narrower body and often a shorter overall length enabling them to fit better into the tight confines of machinery. Welded cylinders do not suffer from failure due to tie rod stretch at high pressures and long strokes. The welded design also lends itself to customization. Special features are easily added to the cylinder body, including special ports, custom mounts, valve manifolds, and so on.

The smooth outer body of welded cylinders also enables the design of multi-stage telescopic cylinders.

Welded body hydraulic cylinders dominate the mobile hydraulic equipment market such as construction equipment (excavators, bulldozers, and road graders) and material handling equipment (forklift trucks, telehandlers, and lift-gates). They are also used by heavy industry in cranes, oil rigs, and large off-road vehicles for above-ground mining operations.

== Piston rod construction ==
The piston rod of a hydraulic cylinder operates both inside and outside the barrel, and consequently both in and out of the hydraulic fluid and surrounding atmosphere.

=== Coatings ===
Wear and corrosion-resistant surfaces are desirable on the outer diameter of the piston rod. The surfaces are often applied using coating techniques such as Chrome (Nickel) Plating, Lunac 2+ duplex, Laser Cladding, PTA welding and Thermal Spraying. These coatings can be finished to the desirable surface roughness (Ra, Rz) where the seals give optimum performance. All these coating methods have their specific advantages and disadvantages. It is for this reason that coating experts play a crucial role in selecting the optimum surface treatment procedure for protecting Hydraulic Cylinders.

Cylinders are used in different operational conditions and that makes it a challenge to find the right coating solution. In dredging there might be impact from stones or other parts, in saltwater environments, there are extreme corrosion attacks, in off-shore cylinders facing bending and impact in combination with salt water, and in the steel industry, there are high temperatures involved, etc. There is no single coating solution that successfully combats all the specific operational wear conditions. Every technique has its own benefits and disadvantages.

=== Length ===
Piston rods are generally available in lengths that are cut to suit the application. As the common rods have a soft or mild steel core, their ends can be welded or machined for a screw thread.

== Distribution of forces on components ==
The forces on the piston face and the piston head retainer vary depending on which piston head retention system is used.

If a circlip (or any non-preloaded system) is used, the force acting to separate the piston head and the cylinder shaft shoulder is the applied pressure multiplied by the area of the piston head. The piston head and shaft shoulder will separate and the load is fully reacted by the piston head retainer.

If a preloaded system is used the force between the cylinder shaft and piston head is initially the piston head retainer preload value. Once pressure has applied this force will reduce. The piston head and cylinder shaft shoulder will remain in contact unless the applied pressure multiplied by the piston head area exceeds the preload.

The maximum force the piston head retainer will see is the larger of the preload and the applied pressure multiplied by the full piston head area. The load on the piston head retainer is greater than the external load, which is due to the reduced shaft size passing through the piston head. Increasing this portion of shaft reduces the load on the retainer.

=== Side loading ===
Side loading is unequal pressure that is not centered on the cylinder rod. This off-center strain can lead to bending of the rod in extreme cases, but more commonly causes leaking due to warping the circular seals into an oval shape. It can also damage and enlarge the bore hole around the rod and the inner cylinder wall around the piston head, if the rod is pressed hard enough sideways to fully compress and deform the seals to make metal-on-metal scraping contact.

The strain of side loading can be directly reduced with the use of internal stop tubes which reduce the maximum extension length, leaving some distance between the piston and bore seal, and increasing leverage to resist warping of the seals. Double pistons also spread out the forces of side loading while also reducing stroke length. Alternately, external sliding guides and hinges can support the load and reduce side loading forces applied directly on the cylinder.

== Cylinder mounting methods ==
Mounting methods also play an important role in cylinder performance. Generally, fixed mounts on the centerline of the cylinder are best for straight-line force transfer and avoiding wear. Common types of mounting include:

Flange mounts—Very strong and rigid, but have little tolerance for misalignment. Experts recommend cap end mounts for thrust loads and rod end mounts where major loading puts the piston rod in tension. Three types are head rectangular flange, head square flange or rectangular head. Flange mounts function optimally when the mounting face attaches to a machine support member.

Side-mounted cylinders—Easy to install and service, but the mounts produce a turning moment as the cylinder applies force to a load, increasing wear and tear. To avoid this, specify a stroke at least as long as the bore size for side mount cylinders (heavy loading tends to make short stroke, large bore cylinders unstable). Side mounts need to be well aligned and the load supported and guided.

Centerline lug mounts —Absorb forces on the centerline, and require dowel pins to secure the lugs to prevent movement at higher pressures or under shock conditions. Dowel pins hold it to the machine when operating at high pressure or under shock loading.

Pivot mounts —Absorb force on the cylinder centerline and let the cylinder change alignment in one plane. Common types include clevises, trunnion mounts and spherical bearings. Because these mounts allow a cylinder to pivot, they should be used with rod-end attachments that also pivot. Clevis mounts can be used in any orientation and are generally recommended for short strokes and small- to medium-bore cylinders.

== Special hydraulic cylinders ==
=== Telescopic cylinder ===
Telescopic cylinder (ISO 1219 symbol)

The length of a hydraulic cylinder is the total of the stroke, the thickness of the piston, the thickness of bottom and head and the length of the connections. Often this length does not fit in the machine. In that case the piston rod is also used as a piston barrel and a second piston rod is used. These kinds of cylinders are called telescopic cylinders. If we call a normal rod cylinder single stage, telescopic cylinders are multi-stage units of two, three, four, five, or more stages. In general telescopic cylinders are much more expensive than normal cylinders. Most telescopic cylinders are single acting (push). Double acting telescopic cylinders must be specially designed and manufactured.

=== Plunger cylinder ===
A hydraulic cylinder without a piston or with a piston without seals is called a plunger cylinder. A plunger cylinder can only be used as a pushing cylinder; the maximum force is piston rod area multiplied by pressure. This means that a plunger cylinder in general has a relatively thick piston rod.

=== Differential cylinder ===
Differential cylinder (ISO 1219 symbol)

A differential cylinder acts like a normal cylinder when pulling. If the cylinder however has to push, the oil from the piston rod side of the cylinder is not returned to the reservoir but goes to the bottom side of the cylinder. In such a way, the cylinder goes much faster, but the maximum force the cylinder can give is like a plunger cylinder. A differential cylinder can be manufactured like a normal cylinder, and only a special control is added.

The above differential cylinder is also called a regenerative cylinder control circuit. This term means that the cylinder is a single rod, double-acting hydraulic cylinder. The control circuit includes a valve and piping which during the extension of the piston, conducts the oil from the rod side of the piston to the other side of the piston instead of to the pump’s reservoir. The oil which is conducted to the other side of the piston is referred to as the regenerative oil.

=== Position sensing "smart" hydraulic cylinder ===
Position sensing hydraulic cylinders eliminate the need for a hollow cylinder rod. Instead, an external sensing "bar" using Hall Effect technology senses the position of the cylinder’s piston. This is accomplished by the placement of a permanent magnet within the piston. The magnet propagates a magnetic field through the steel wall of the cylinder, providing a locating signal to the sensor.
