= High strain composite structure =

High Strain Composite Structures (HSC Structures) are a class of composite material structures designed to perform in a high deformation setting. High strain composite structures transition from one shape to another upon the application of external forces. A single HSC Structure component is designed to transition between at least two, but often more, dramatically different shapes. At least one of the shapes is designed to function as a structure which can support external loads.

High strain composite structures usually consist of fiber-reinforced polymers (FRP), which are designed to undergo relatively high material strain levels under the course of normal operating conditions in comparison to most FRP structural applications. FRP materials are anisotropic and highly tailor-able which allows for unique effects upon deformation. As a result, many HSC Structures are configured to possess one or more stable states (shapes at which the structure will remain without external constraints) which are tuned for a particular application. HSC Structures with multiple stable states can also be classified as bi-stable structures.

HSC Structures are most often used in applications where low weight structures are desired that can also be stowed in a small volume. Flexible composite structures are used within the aerospace industry for deployable mechanisms such antennas or solar arrays on spacecraft. Other applications focus on materials or structures in which multiple stable configurations are required.

== History ==
Metals commonly used in springs (e.g. high strength steel, aluminum and beryllium copper alloys) have been utilized in deformable aerospace structures for several decades with considerable success. They continue to be used in the majority of high strain deployable structure applications and excel where the greatest compaction ratios and electrical conductivity are required. But metals suffer from having high densities, high coefficients of thermal expansion, and lower strain capacities when compared to composite materials. In recent decades, the increasing need for high performance deployable structures, coupled with the emergence of a robust composite materials industry, has increased the demand and utility for High Strain Composites Structures. Today HSCs are used in a variety of niche aerospace applications, mostly in areas where extreme precision and low mass are required.

In early 2014 the American Institute of Aeronautics and Astronautics Spacecraft Structures Technical Committee recognized that the level of active research and development in High Strain Composites warranted an independent focus group to distinguish high strain composites as a technical area with uniquely identifiable challenges, technologies, mechanics, test methods, and applications. The High Strains Composite Technical Subcommittee was formed to provide a forum and framework to support HSC technical challenges and successes, and will promote continued advances in the field.

== Space-Flight Heritage ==
The use of high strain deployable structures dates back to the pioneering days of space exploration and has played a crucial role in enabling a robust spacefaring industry.

Milestones in Space-Based Deformable Structures

Structure Common Name	Material	Development History	Flight History	References
Tape-Spring Hinge	Spring steel sheet			
Storable Tubular Extendible Mast (STEM)	Metal sheet	Developed by de Havilland Canada and Spar Aerospace Ltd.	1961-AH2 Transit Research and Attitude Control (TRAAC), launched 1961. Alouette 1, launched in 1962	
Wrap Rib Antenna, C-Shaped Ribs	Aluminum sheet	Developed by Lockheed Missiles & Space Company starting in 1962	ATS-6, launched in 1974.	
Lenticular Tube	Stainless steel sheet	Developed by NASA Lewis Research Center in 1965		
Continuous Longeron Mast	S2 fiberglass rods	Developed by Astro Aerospace.	USAF S-3 Magnetometer Boom launched in 1974.	
Lattice Lenticular Tube	Steel music wire	Developed by Astro Research Corporation in 1969.		
Wrap Rib Antenna, Lenticular Ribs	Glass fiber reinforced polymer laminate (Fiberite HMS/33)	Developed by Lockheed Missiles & Space Company in the 1970s; ground demonstration 1982.		
Spring Back Antenna Parabolic Reflector	Glass fiber reinforced polymer laminate		Mobile Sat-1, launched in 1996	
Foldable Flattenable Tubes	fiberglass and Kevlar laminate	Developed by TRW Astro Aerospace for MARSIS antennas, launched 2003	Mars Express MARSIS antennas, launched in 2003	

== Material Classification ==
Rigid Polymer

Rigidizable Polymer

Elastomeric Polymer

== Technical Challenges ==
Creep

Thin Shell Buckling

Simulation Methods

== See also ==
Composite material

Fiber-reinforced plastic

Bistability
