= Hoberman mechanism =

Mechanism that turns linear motion into radial motion

Two-dimensional Hoberman mechanism made of 24 angulated bars and 36 revolute joints

Animation of a Hoberman sphere in the form of a spherical icosidodecahedron with each of its six geodesics distinctly coloured, the grey ring viewed face on and the far hemisphere muted

A Hoberman mechanism, or Hoberman linkage, is a deployable mechanism that turns linear motion into radial motion. The Hoberman mechanism is made of two angulated rigid bars connected at a central point by a revolute joint, making it move much like a scissor mechanism. Multiple of these linkages can be joined together at the ends of the angulated bars by more revolute joints, expanding radially to make circle shaped mechanisms. The mechanism is a GAE (generalize angulated element) where the coupler curve is a radial straight line. This allows the Hoberman mechanism to act with a single degree of freedom, meaning that it is an over-constrained mechanism because the mobility formula predicts that it would have a smaller degree of freedom than it does, as the mechanism has more degrees of freedom than the mobility formula predicts.

The kinematic theory behind the Hoberman mechanism has been used to help further the understanding of mobility and foldability of deployable mechanisms.

== History ==
The Hoberman mechanism originates from the idea of making something bigger become smaller. Chuck Hoberman, a fine arts graduate from Cooper Union, realized that his lack in knowledge of engineering was holding him back from creating the things he could picture in his head. He enrolled in Columbia University to get a masters in mechanical engineering. After this he started working with origami, studying the way that it folded and changed shape. He soon realized that his interests lay in the expansion and shrinkage of the objects he was making. Hoberman started to experiment with different expanding mechanisms and started to create mechanisms of his own. He later patented a system that uses two identical bent rods connected in the middle by a joint, which he called the Hoberman mechanism. The creation of the Hoberman mechanism has since helped with more mechanical discoveries and research concerning foldability and mobility of mechanisms.

== Mechanics ==
=== Principle ===
The Hoberman mechanism is made of two identical angulated rods joined together at their bends by one central revolute joint. These mechanisms can be linked by connecting the ends of the pairs together with two more revolute joints. Due to the mechanism's design, however, the revolute joints act as if they are prismatic-revolute joints because they move along a straight axis as the system changes shape. By pushing or pulling on any of the joints, the entire system moves and changes shape, gaining volume or folding into itself. These systems of linkages can be expanded to a full circle where it moves as one system, turning linear motion from a single axis of a joint into radial motion across the entire mechanism.

=== Kinematic theory ===
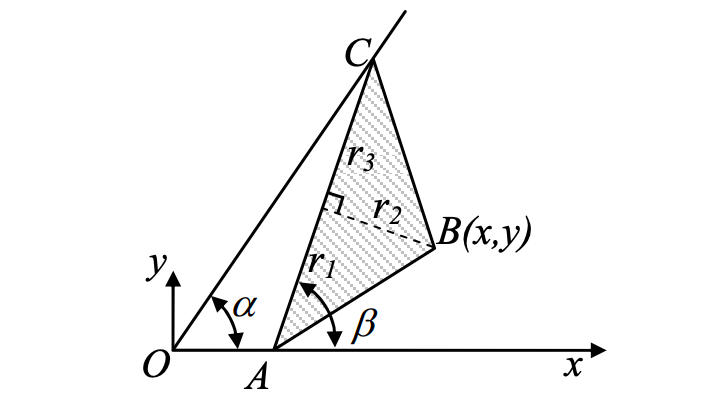
Fig 1. Example of a single PRRP linkage

A Hoberman mechanism made of 12 angulated bars and 18 revolute joints

The Hoberman mechanism is a single degree of freedom structure meaning that the system can be driven with a single actuator. The mechanism is made of two identical angulated rods joined together by a central revolute pivot and four end pivots constrained to move along a single line. Because the four end pivots are restrained in this way, the mechanism can be treated as pair of PRRP (prismatic-revolute-revolute-prismatic) mechanisms joined at a central point. The two PRRP linkages trace a pair of identical straight lines from the origin of the mechanism to their coupler points, so they have the same coupler curve. The equation for the coupler curve of the PRRP linkages in a Hoberman mechanism follows the coupler point B(x,y) in Fig. 1:

$$y = x\ \tan\frac{\alpha}{2} \qquad \tan\frac{\alpha}{2} = \frac{r_2}{r_1}$$

For parameters {r_{1},r_{2},α}, this equation of the coupler curve follows the equation for a straight line (y = mx). Because the two angulated rods that make up a Hoberman mechanism are identical, they have the same r_{1} and r_{2} values and thus the same coupler curve.

A pair of PRRP linkages that share a coupler curve at a common coupler point have a single degree of freedom, which is why the Hoberman mechanism has a single degree of freedom. The motion that the Hoberman mechanism produces is radial motion, even though it looks like linear motion, because the motion follows the coupler curve, which is a radial straight line.

The mobility formula for a single degree of freedom M = 3(n – 1) – 2j, where M is the degrees of freedom, n is the number of moving elements, and j is the number of joints, predicts that a Hoberman mechanism of 12 bars and 18 joints would have −3 degrees of freedom. That makes the Hoberman mechanism a over-constrained mechanism because all Hoberman mechanisms have a single degree of freedom.

== Applications ==
The Hoberman mechanism has been used in many different parts of everyday life.

=== Art ===
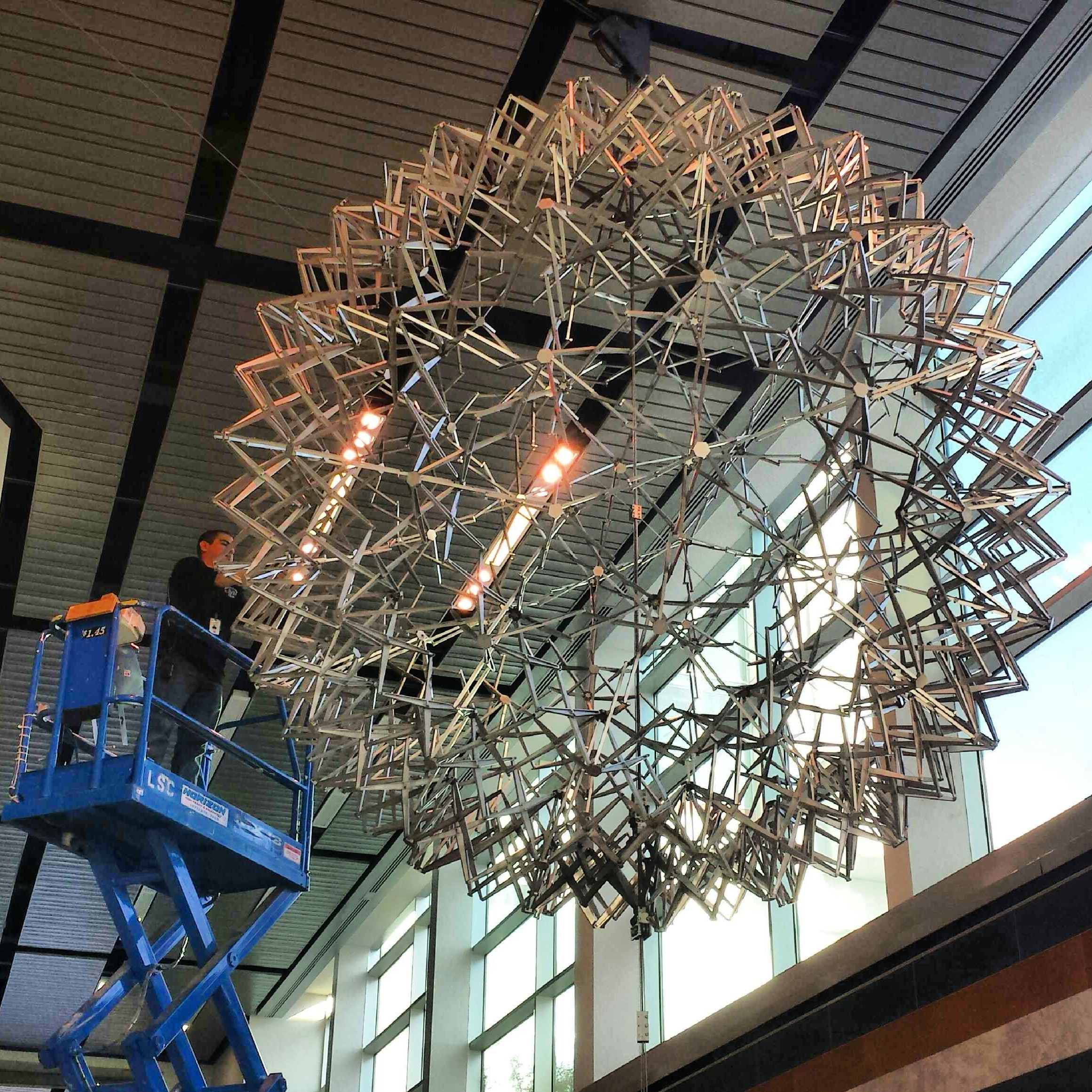
Hoberman sphere featured at the Liberty Science Center

The Hoberman mechanism is featured in works of art, mostly made by artist and inventor of the Hoberman mechanism, Chuck Hoberman. Structures designed by Chuck Hoberman that included the Hoberman mechanism were featured in The Elaine Dannheisser Projects Series from MoMA. A Hoberman sphere also was on display at the MoMA in New York as a part of the Century of the Child exhibit. More large Hoberman spheres featuring the Hoberman mechanism are scattered around the world; they can be found anywhere from science centers around the US to wineries in France.

=== Toys ===
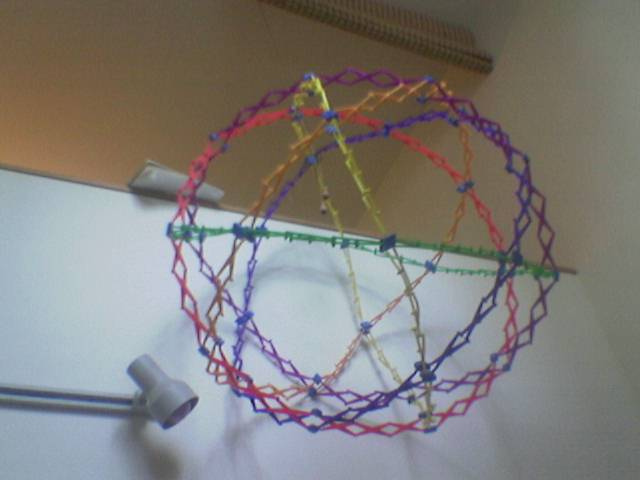
Mega Sphere with 6 rings of Hoberman mechanisms

The most commonly seen form of the Hoberman mechanism is in the toy made by Chuck Hoberman called the Mega Sphere or Hoberman sphere. The Mega Sphere is a plastic, sphere shaped toy that expands and retracts as it is pushed and pulled on. The toy is made of six full rings of Hoberman mechanisms that are all connected to each other so as one piece of it retracts or expands, the entirety of the structure follows. They are multicolored and range in size from a meter to just a few inches.

=== Architecture ===
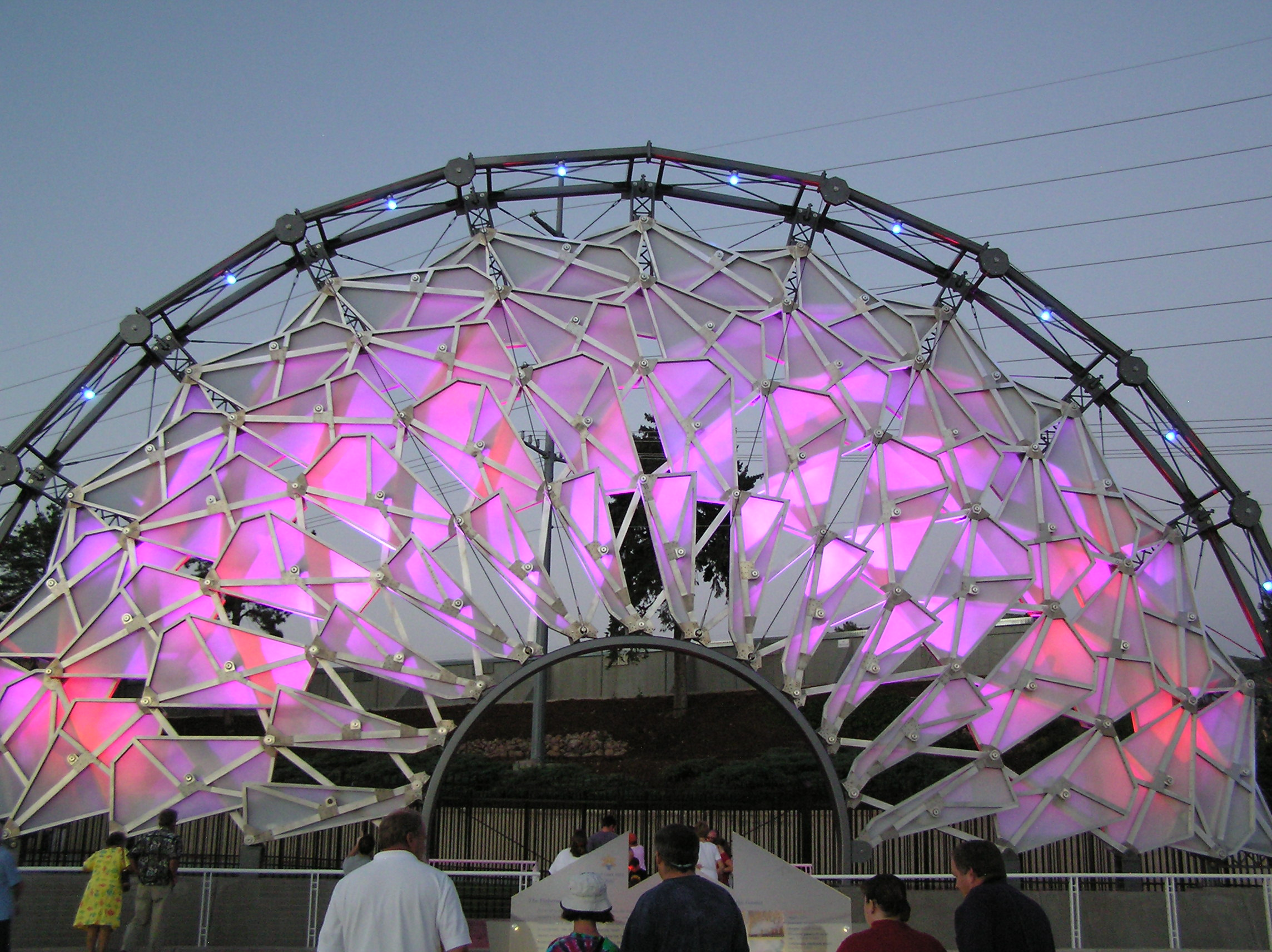
Hoberman Arch featured at the 2002 winter Olympics in Utah

The Hoberman mechanism has also been used in larger scale architectural projects. One of these structures is the Hoberman Arch featured the 2002 winter Olympics in Utah. The Arch was designed by Chuck Hoberman; it was built to open and close using many interlocked Hoberman mechanisms, acting as a mechanical curtain on the award ceremony stage.

=== Engineering ===
By replacing the pin joints with temperature reactive shape memory polymers, a Hoberman mechanism can be used to autonomously deploy engineering systems such as photovoltaic cells when the ambient temperature increases above a threshold.
