= Liberty Science Center =

Museum in Jersey City, New Jersey

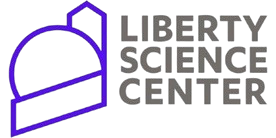
- Logo of the Liberty Science Center

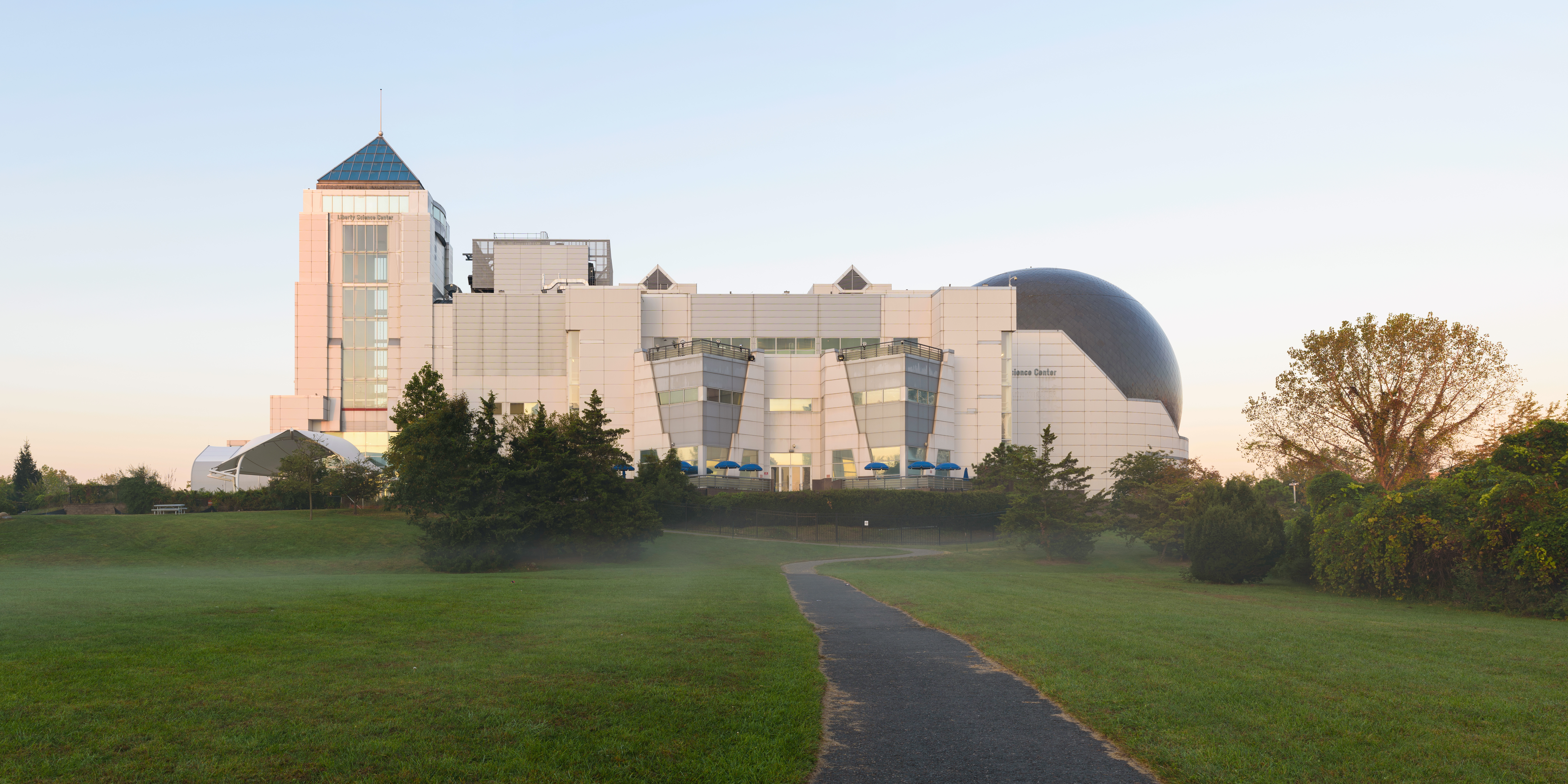
- Exterior of Liberty Science Center

- Location of Liberty Science Center in New Jersey
- Established: 1993
- Location: Liberty State Park, Jersey City, New Jersey, US
- Coordinates: 40.708312°N 74.054246°W
- Type: Science museum
- Visitors: 750,000 per year
- President & CEO: Paul Hoffman
- Chairperson: David Barry/John Weston
- Public transit access: Hudson–Bergen Light Rail at Liberty State Park: West Side–Tonnelle; 8th Street–Hoboken; Bayonne Flyer
- Parking: On-site (daily charge)
- Website: lsc.org

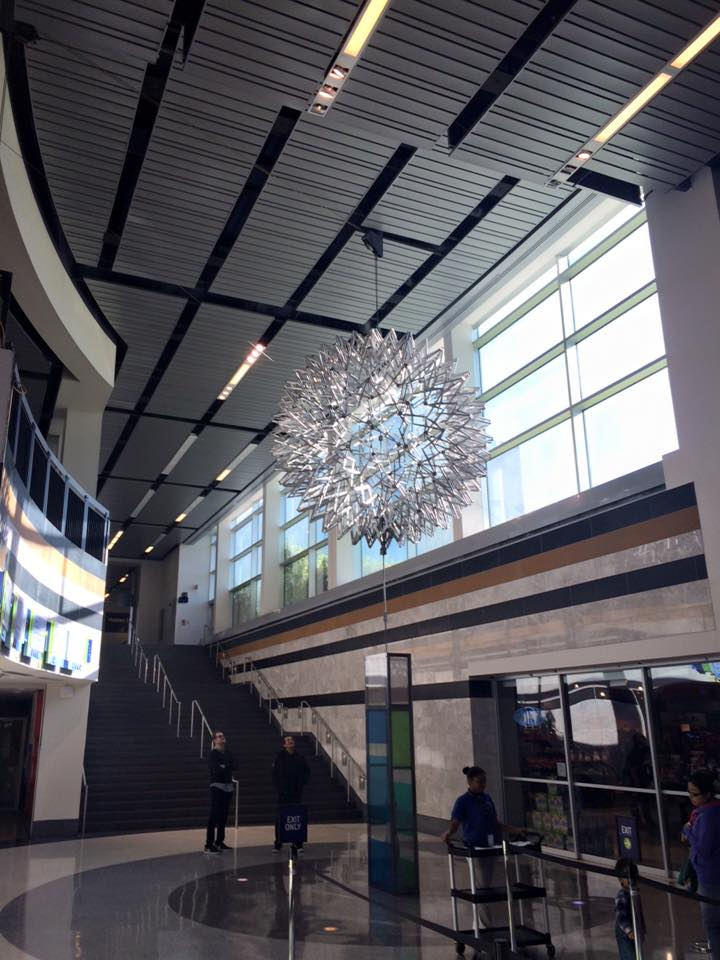
Hoberman sphere at Liberty Science Center

Liberty Science Center (LSC) is an interactive science museum and learning center located in Liberty State Park in Jersey City, New Jersey, United States. At its opening, it was the largest such planetarium in the Western Hemisphere and the world's fourth largest.

The center, which opened in 1993 as New Jersey's first major state science museum, has science exhibits, numerous educational resources, and the original Hoberman sphere, a silver, computer-driven engineering artwork designed by Chuck Hoberman.

== History ==
Liberty Science Center completed a 22-month, $109 million expansion and renewal project on July 19, 2007. The expansion added 100,000 square feet (9,300 m^{2}) to the facility, bringing it to nearly 300,000 square feet (28,000 m^{2}).

In December 2017, the Science Center opened the Jennifer Chalsty Planetarium, a 400-seat facility with a dome 100 feet (30 m) in diameter and an 89-foot (27 m) diameter screen, named for the benefactor who contributed $5 million towards the cost of construction. Larger than New York City's Hayden Planetarium, at its opening, it was the largest such planetarium in the Western Hemisphere and the world's fourth largest.

In November 2025, the New Jersey Economic Development Authority awarded up to $39.8 million in tax credits over five years through its Cultural Arts Facilities Expansion (CAFE) program. The project, known as Project Supernova, will include a major expansion to the museum and add several outdoor exhibits and amenities, including:

- Physics-themed mini golf course
- Kids Corner, a playground with goats and a barn
- 9/11 memorial with two structural beams from the World Trade Center
- North America river otter indoor and outdoor habitat
- Replaces the Our Hudson Home exhibition with River Rising, a climate change-related exhibition about the Hudson River
- Relocating the traveling exhibition gallery from the fourth floor to a larger first-floor space to accommodate larger exhibition
- Upgrades to the Jennifer Chalsty Planetarium
- Expansion of the Wild About Animals habitat

In September 2026, LSC broke ground on Project Supernova.

== Exhibits ==
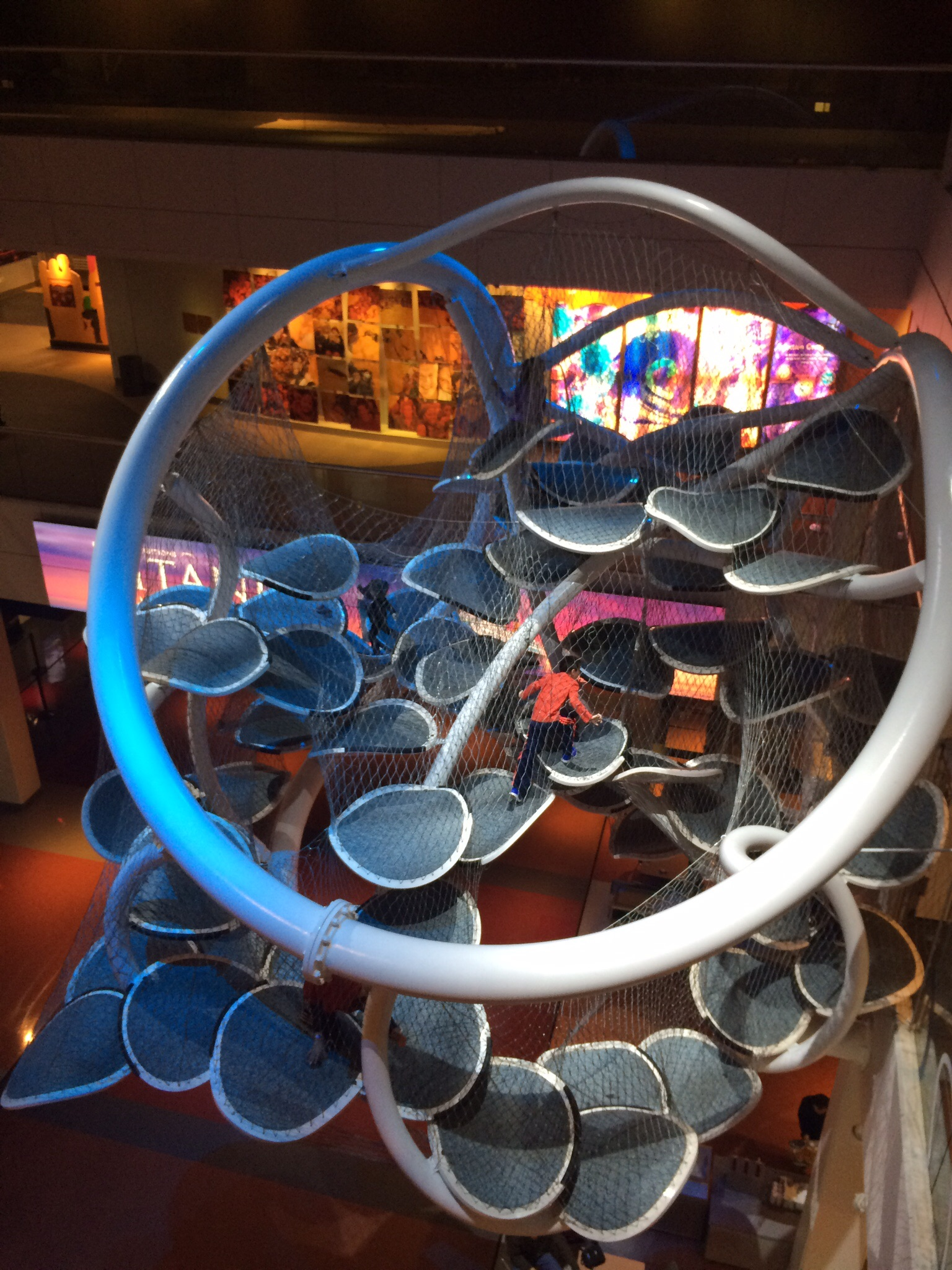
The Infinity Climber climbing course

Liberty Science Center's permanent exhibitions include:

=== 1st Floor ===
- Cosmic Portal – The main entrance hallway with audiovisual effects designed to replicate entering a wormhole
- Hoberman Sphere – The second largest Hoberman sphere in the world, designed by Chuck Hoberman (2nd Floor)

=== 2nd Floor ===
- Boom Time – An exhibit where objects such as watermelons, pumpkins, and bouncy balls are blown up with liquid nitrogen
- Science on a Sphere – An exhibit featuring the only official NOAA Science on a Sphere in New Jersey
- Wobbly World – An exhibition for young children where they are invited to explore balance, motion, and cause and effect
- The Liberty Express – A miniature passenger train holding up to 16 people
- Joseph D. Williams 3D Science Theater – A 3D theater featuring three shows, including a T. rex show, a show about oceans, and a Nikola Tesla phaser show
- Jennifer Chalsty Planetarium - A Planetarium theater featuring live shows performed by staff, as well as full-dome movies.

=== 3rd Floor ===
- Wild About Animals – An animal exhibition of over 100 species, including cotton-top tamarin monkeys, naked mole-rats, leafcutter ants, and a piranha tank
- Microbes Rule! – An exhibition featuring microbial art, a giant microscope, and an interactive paint-your-own microbe art exhibit
  - Making Mammoths – An exhibition on George Church's Mammoth Revival Project, a project exploring a way to revive wooly mammoths using CRISPR gene editing on Asian elephants
- Dream Machine – A sensory adventure utilizing bicycle pumps to produce combinations of colors, sounds, and scents, each themed around human emotions
- The Great Train Set – A 1:32 scale model train exhibit on the Lackawanna Railroad in the early 1950s, including a POV projection from miniature cameras on the train
- Bees to Bots – An exhibition dedicated to honey bees, including a beehive and exhibits exploring how scientists study bees
- Wonder Why – An exhibit intended to experience the "wonder and joy of science", including a rock climbing wall, a fluorescent mineral display, and optical illusions
- Touch Tunnel – An 80-foot, crawl-through, pitch-black tunnel
- Infinity Climber – A netted suspended climbing play structure

=== 4th Floor ===
- Universe Revealed – An exhibition on the James Webb Space Telescope
- Energy Quest – An interactive exhibition on energy, including plasma, hydrocarbons, oil, nuclear power, and renewable energy such as solar and wind
- Pixel Art – A 952-dial pixel art wall where visitors can change the pixels to over 1,000 different colors
- Brain Games – An interactive exhibit centered around critical thinking, including coding a robot to create platonic solids with magnets, create patterns using foam blocks, solving Rubik's cubes, and more
- Our Hudson Home – An exhibit about the Hudson River (partially open for renovations, to be replaced with an exhibit called River Rising)

=== Outdoors ===
- Dino Dig Adventure – A 1,750 square foot outdoor exhibition with 60 tons of sand, where visitors can dig for dinosaur fossils (2nd Floor)

=== Temporary Exhibits ===
As of November 2025, Liberty Science Center's temporary exhibits include:

- SUE The T. rex Experience – An exact replica of the T. rex SUE's skeleton, including a multimedia simulation show (4th Floor)
- Daniel Tiger's Neighborhood – An exhibit about Daniel Tiger's Neighborhood, as well as character meet and greets

=== Educational Programs, Events, and Other Amenities ===
==== Educational ====
The museum offers various educational sessions for school-age students from PreK-12 during field trips, featuring different educational sessions at various exhibits throughout the museum. The museum features the Center for Learning and Teaching, which contains laboratory workshops designed for student sessions. Other student sessions include the Maker & Tech studio focused around programming and tech, a live surgical session, climate change programs, planetarium shows, a Science on a Sphere session, as well as additional early childhood programs. The museum also features stage shows for students grades PreK-8, which consists of live-action demonstrations. The museum also allows homeschool co-ops and are able to bring lecturers to schools.

The Liberty Science Center also offers professional development sessions for teachers and schools to learn more about STEM subjects.

During the summer, Liberty Science Center offers the Partners in Science program, an 8-week summer high school STEM mentorship for rising high school juniors and seniors. There is also the Pathways to Partners in Science program, a two-week program intended for rising sophomores.

==== Events ====
Liberty Science Center's "LSC After Dark" is an 18+ event hosted on some Thursdays from 6-10PM. Each event features a different theme with a matching food menu, dance floor, live DJ, a full bar, and planetarium and laser shows, as well as Space Talk sessions with guest astronomers in the planetarium.

The museum offer Community Evenings, which consists of free visitations for parents and students from qualifying school districts, which largely consists of disadvantaged municipalities.

The BASF's Kids' Lab is an interactive chemistry exhibit for children.

During the summers, Liberty Science Center has a Science Camp, which consists of weekly multi-day events for children between grades 1-8.

The museum offers Scouts programming to help scouts earn badges, as well as special scout-only sessions periodically throughout the year.

==== Other Amenities ====
In the lobby, there is a first aid and information desk, the box office, lockers, and the gift shop. On the second floor, dining options include the Cosmic Cafe, a cafeteria open to the general public, Galaxy Grab and Go, a vending machine room, and a group dining room for organized groups.

== Jennifer Chalsty Center for Science Learning and Teaching ==
In July 2007, the Jennifer Chalsty Center for Science Learning and Teaching opened. It is a 20,000-square-foot (1,900 m^{2}) facility extending over the entire former Invention Floor of Liberty Science Center, with six laboratories, a 150-seat theater, and other resources for teachers and students. Educators can upgrade science teaching skills and find peers to help strengthen science instruction in the classroom, while students can participate in intense, multi-day or single-hour programs to ignite interest and skills in science exploration.

Planetarium shows include:

- Tonight's Sky Live – A show featuring live space imagery
- Journey to the Planets – A show featuring planets of the Solar System
- Space Trip – A semi-fictional show featuring things from riding a roller coaster on Mars all the way to exploring the edge of the universe
- Black Holes: The Other Side of Infinity – A show about black holes, as well as traveling to one at the center of the Milky Way
- One World, Big Sky: Big Bird's Adventure – A Sesame Street themed show featuring Elmo and Big Bird, where they teach about the Big Dipper, the North Star, and the Sun and the Moon.
- Guest Talk – Guest astronomer talks occurring during LSC After Dark events

== Genius Award and Gallery ==
The LSC hosts an annual Gala and Genius Award as well as Genius Gallery, a permanent, interactive display. The full list of awardees: 2011: Jane Goodall; 2012: Temple Grandin, Ernő Rubik, Oliver Sacks; 2013: Sir Richard Branson, Garry Kasparov, Cori Bargmann; 2014: Dean Kamen, Sylvia A. Earle, J. Craig Venter; 2015: Jeff Bezos, Vint Cerf, Jill Tarter; 2016: Frank Gehry, Jack Horner, Ellen Langer, Kip Thorne; 2017: Katherine Johnson, Ray Kurzweil, Marc Raibert (and SpotMini); 2018: Vitalik Buterin, George M. Church, Laurie Santos, Sara Seager; 2019: Chris Messina, Sally Shaywitz and Bennett Shaywitz, Martine Rothblatt, Karlie Kloss; 2020: Moshe Safdie, Jennifer A. Lewis, William Conan Davis.

== Sci Tech Scity proposal ==
In 2019 LSC was in negotiation with Jersey City to receive for a nominal fee city-owned land (a former car pound) which would be developed as an educational and residential area called Sci Tech Scity. Phase one of the project is scheduled to open in late 2023 and into early 2024.
