= Position-sensing hydraulic cylinder =

A position-sensing hydraulic cylinder is a hydraulic cylinder with an integrated position feedback sensor to determine its current position.

Position-sensing hydraulic cylinders may be found in heavy industry, subsea, and mobile heavy equipment applications.

== Linear Displacement Transducers ==
=== Internal LDT ===
With In-cylinder Linear Displacement Transducers (LDTs), the hydraulic cylinder’s piston rod must be bored through its center to accommodate certain elements of the LDT — usually the waveguide tube of a magnetostrictive transducer. The machining and additional production steps associated with “gun drilling” the piston rod can add cost to the finished cylinder. Magnetostrictive LDTs provide extremely high accuracy, down to one micron.

Hydraulic cylinder with a Hall effect sensor mounted along its barrel to sense position of a magnetic piston inside. The sensor is mounted without having to gun drill the piston rod, yet its size and location protect it from potential environmental damage.

=== External LDT ===
External linear displacement transducers (LDTs) eliminate the need for a hollow hydraulic cylinder rod. Instead, an external sensing “bar” utilizing Hall-Effect technology senses the position of the hydraulic cylinder piston. This is accomplished by the placement of a permanent magnet within the piston.

An external Linear Displacement Transducer (LDT) utilizes a magnet that generates a magnetic field, which passes through the steel wall of a hydraulic cylinder. This magnetic field provides a locating signal to an external sensor.

Advantages of external LDTs include:

- Preservation of Rod Strength: The full buckling strength of the rod is maintained.
- Ease of Maintenance: The cylinder design simplifies assembly, installation, and servicing.
- Versatility in Connectivity: There is a wide range of sensor inputs and outputs available.
- Accessibility: The external sensor is easily accessible and can be replaced if necessary without the need for recalibration.
- Durability: The small sensing bar is positioned along the exterior of the hydraulic cylinder, reducing the risk of environmental damage.
- Accuracy: The positioning accuracy is +/- 0.5 mm, which is sufficient for most mobile equipment applications.
