= Deployable structure =

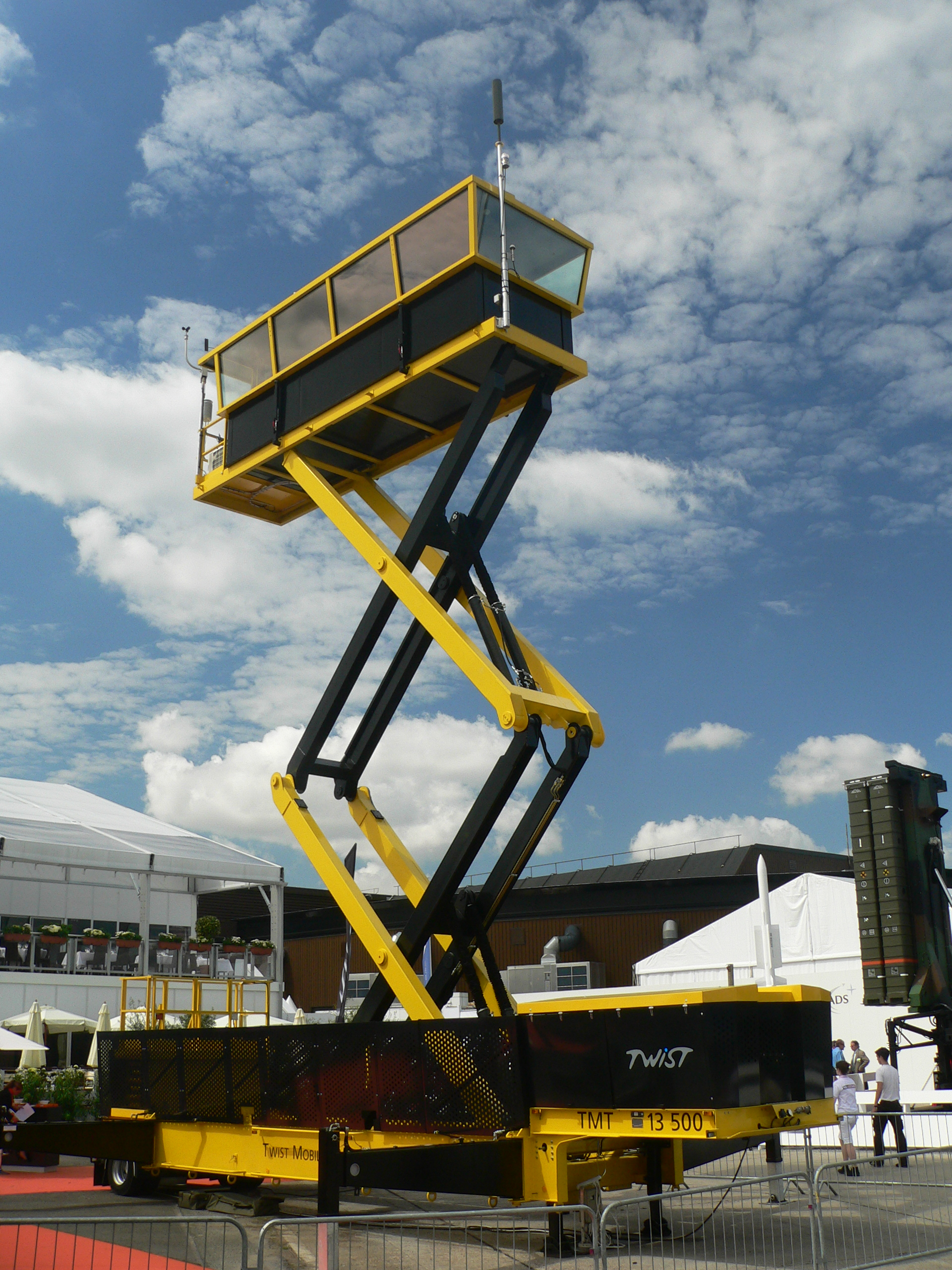
A field deployable control tower

A deployable structure is a structure that can change shape so as to significantly change its size. Examples of deployable structures are umbrellas, some tensegrity structures, bistable structures, some Origami shapes and scissor-like structures. Deployable structures are also used on spacecraft for deploying solar panels and solar sails.

Space-based deployable structures can be categorized into three primary classes: the first is the articulated structure class wherein rigid members contain sliding contact joints or are folded at hinge points and pivot to deploy, often locking into place. The second class consists of on-orbit assembly where a device is fabricated and/or mechanically joined in space to form the structure. The final class is high strain structures (often composed of High strain composites) wherein the device is dramatically flexed from one configuration to another during deployment.

== Gallery ==
Scissor-type structure

Multiple scissor-type structure

Simple Hoberman mechanism

Compound Hoberman mechanism

Outward folding deployable ring structure

Inward folding deployable ring structure

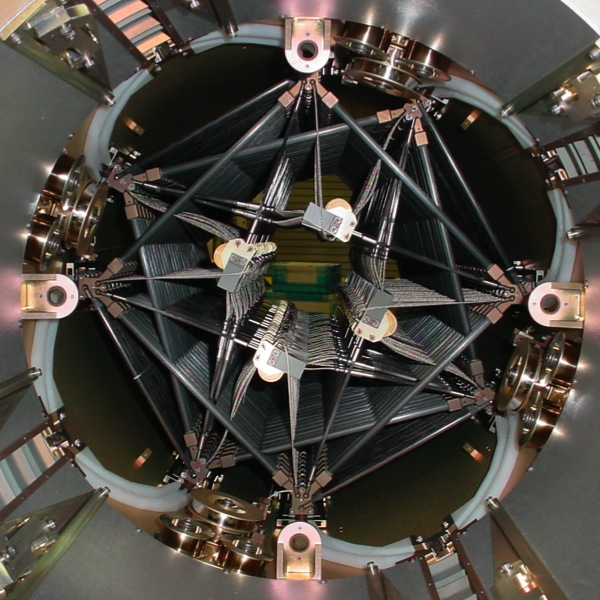
NuSTAR mast in the stowed configuration.

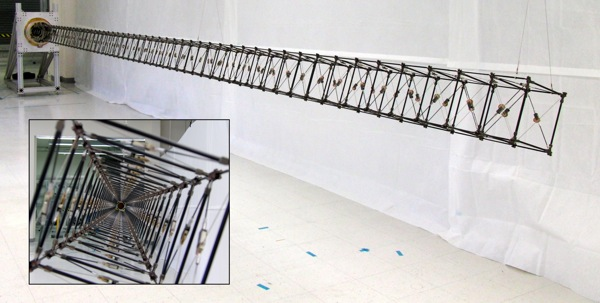
NuSTAR mast deployed.

== See also ==
- Engineering mechanics
- Four-bar linkage
- Kinematics
- Linkage (mechanical)
- Machine
- Outline of machines
- Overconstrained mechanism
- Parallel motion
- Slider-crank linkage
- Compliant mechanism
