= Scissors mechanism =

Mechanical linkage system

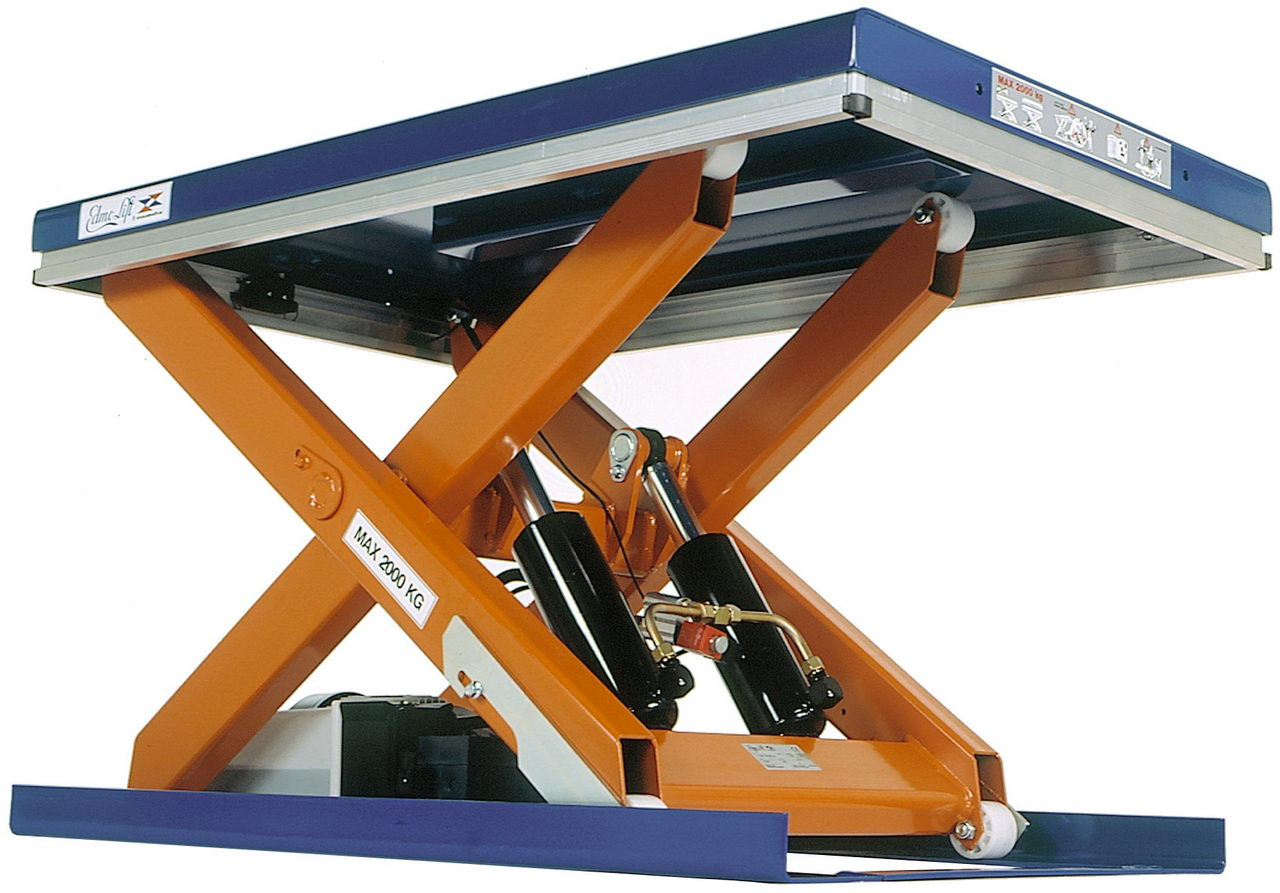
An example of a simple scissor lift

A pantograph mirror

A scissors mechanism uses linked, folding supports in a criss-cross 'X' pattern.

The scissor mechanism is a mechanical linkage system used to create vertical motion or extension. It consists of a series of interconnected, folding supports that resemble the shape of a pair of scissors, hence its name. The scissor mechanism is widely employed in various applications, including scissor lifts, folding tables, adjustable height platforms, and automotive jacks.

== Workings ==
Extension occurs when force causes the crossed supports to rotate about their pivot points, increasing the mechanism's height or reach. The force may be supplied hydraulically, pneumatically, mechanically, or manually.

In a hydraulic or pneumatic lift, fluid or air pressure extends a cylinder, which spreads the scissor legs and raises the platform. To lower the lift, the operator opens a valve to release the fluid or air pressure, allowing the legs to fold and the platform to descend.

== Uses ==
Animation of a Hoberman sphere in the form of an spherical icosidodecahedron, with six geodesics each comprising ten distinctly coloured scissors mechanisms

Scissors mechanisms are used in devices such as lift tables and scissor lifts. Modern low-profile computer keyboards also use a scissor mechanism beneath each key to provide smooth vertical movement while retaining a rubber-dome contact system, rather than an array of mechanical switches.

== See also ==
- Pantograph
- Telescopic cylinder
- Linear actuator
