= Haggai Hoberman =

Israeli journalist and author

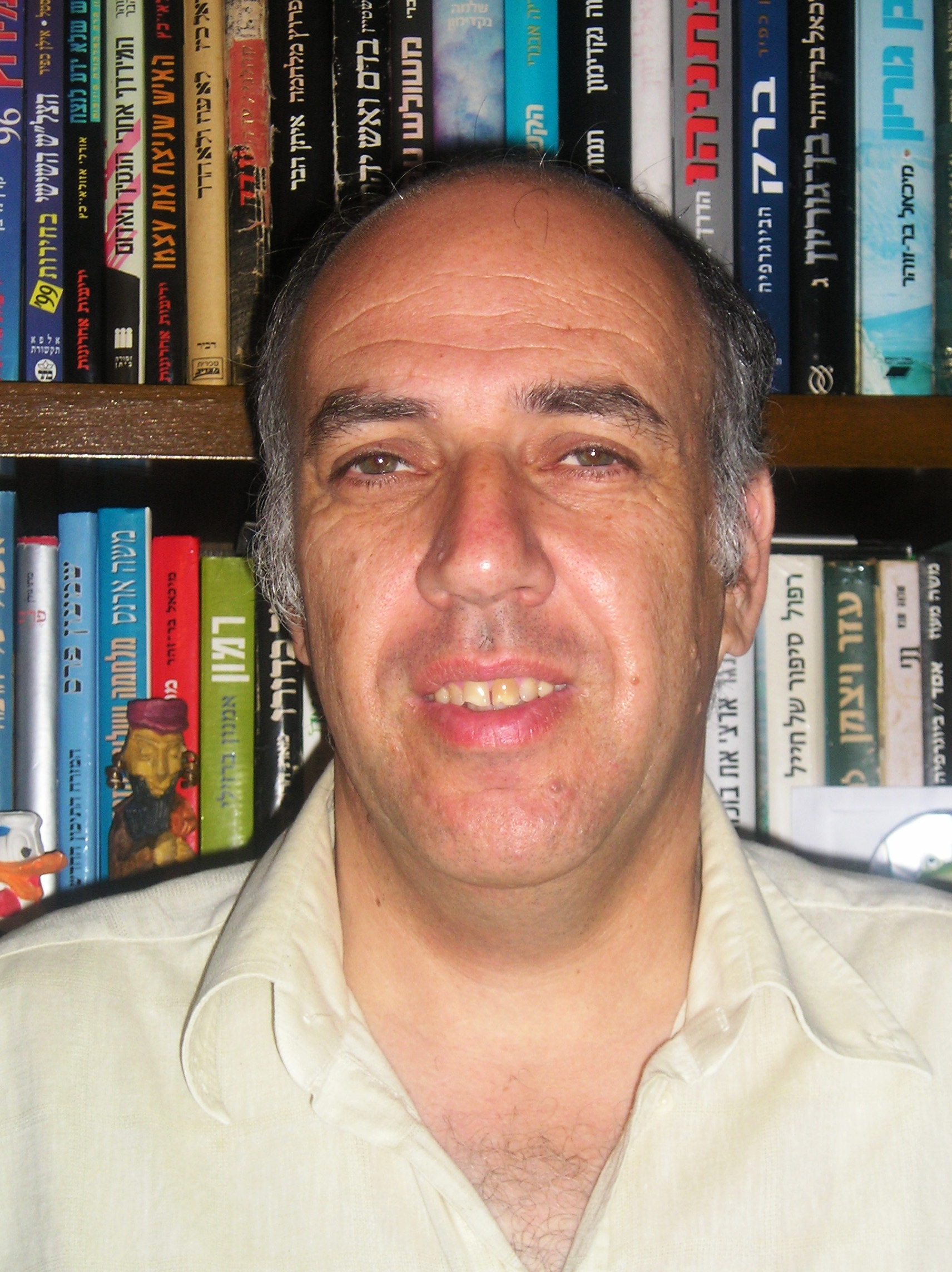
A portrait of Haggai Hoberman

Haggai Hoberman (Hebrew: חגי הוברמן; born 24 Nisan 1959) is an Israeli journalist and author.

== Biography ==
Haggai Hoberman grew up in Haifa. He served in the Nahal brigade in Kfar Etzion. Subsequent to completing his army service, he worked as a welder in the Amgazit factory. In 1984, he moved to Netzarim for three years and then to Bnei Darom.

== Journalism career ==
He began his journalistic career at Zra'im, a Bnei Akiva newspaper. Later, he served as night editor at HaTzofe. He was the paper's settlement affairs correspondent for fourteen years.

In 2007, after HaTzofe was bought out, he became the military affairs correspondent for Makor Rishon.

== Published works ==
- Eretz Moledet (1994): (lit. Homeland) Touring Israel through its past, pub. Bet El Publishing (in Hebrew)
- Yichudo shel Kfar (2003): (lit. Uniqueness of the Village) the story of Kfar Haroeh (in Hebrew)
- Shorashim Becholot (2005): (lit. Roots in the Sand) the story of Gush Katif from its beginning to the end (in Hebrew)
- Keneged Kol HaSikuim (2008): (lit. Against all Odds) 40 years of settlement in Yesha, pub. Netzarim Publishing (in Hebrew)
