= Chuck Hoberman =

American architect (born 1956)

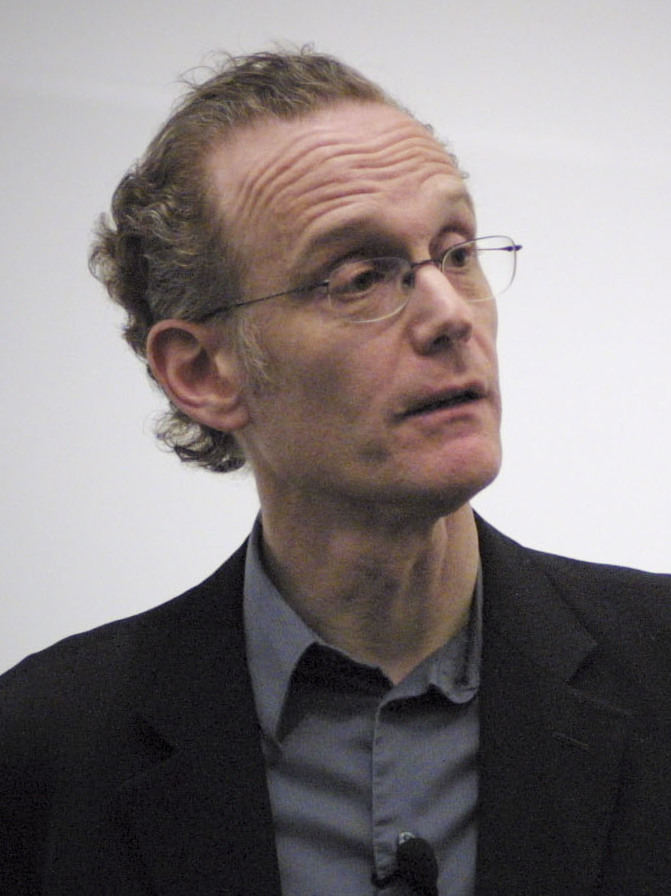
- Hoberman mid-description, 2009
- Born: 1956 (age 69–70)
- Education: Cooper Union (BA); Columbia University (MS)
- Occupations: Artist, engineer, architect, and inventor of folding toys
- Known for: Hoberman sphere Hoberman Arch

Chuck Hoberman (born 1956) is an artist, engineer, architect, and inventor of folding toys and structures, most notably the Hoberman sphere.

== Early life and education ==
Hoberman's father was an architect, and his mother, Mary Ann Hoberman, was a children's book author. He wanted to be an artist from an early age, doing drawing and painting, and eventually taking courses at Cooper Union in New York City. He studied liberal arts at Brown University, and went on to earn a bachelor's degree in sculpture from Cooper Union in 1979, and a master's degree in mechanical engineering from Columbia University. At some point during his education, he was asked to produce a sculpture that could move. He made a work that unrolled colored plastic sheets on the floor, and he became fascinated with kinetic art. Finishing his formal education, he then went to work for a robotics engineering firm, where he added computer modeling (CAD-CAM) to his skills. After six years, he left to pursue his artistic and technical interests full-time.

== Temporary and permanent installations ==
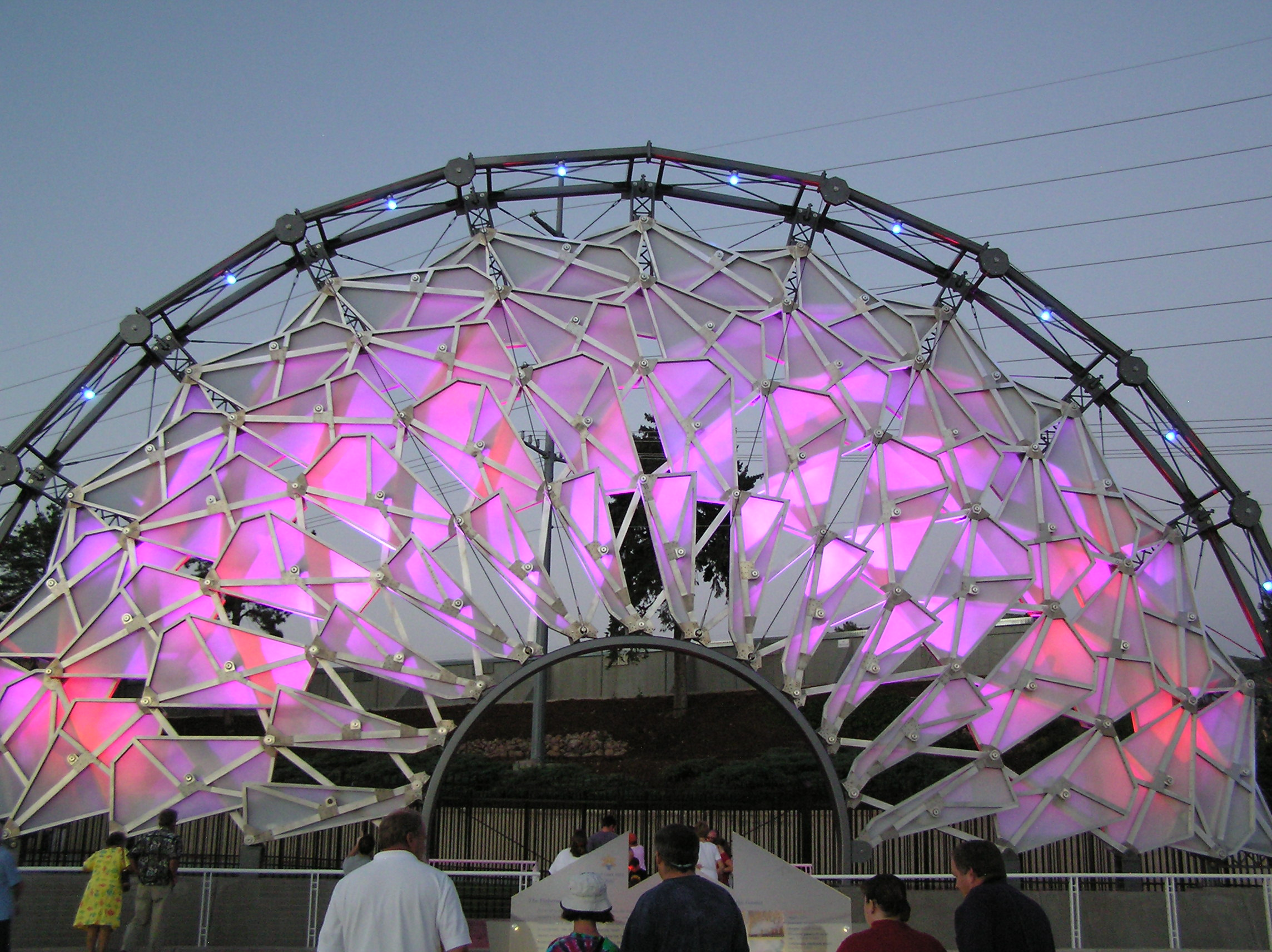
Hoberman Arch, Salt Lake 2002 Olympic Cauldron Park

The two largest Hoberman spheres are motorized, 5.5–6 m in diameter, and suspended above open rooms in science centers. One is displayed in the AHHAA Science Center in Tartu, Estonia, and the second is displayed in Liberty Science Center in Jersey City, New Jersey.

Hoberman has designed other folding architectural structures, such as the Expanding Hypar (1997) at the California Museum of Science and Industry; the Hoberman Arch, the centerpiece of the medals plaza for the 2002 Salt Lake City Olympics; and a retractable dome featured at the World's Fair 2000 in Hanover, Germany. His artwork has been exhibited at international museums including the New York's Museum of Modern Art, the Centre Georges Pompidou in Paris, and the Mycal Otaru Bay in Hokkaidō, Japan.

Hoberman has installed permanent building facades that transform in transparency at the Wyss Institute for Biologically Inspired Engineering of Harvard University and the Simons Center for Geometry and Physics at Stony Brook University. He designed the Hoberman Arch as a centerpiece of Salt Lake City during the 2002 Olympics. It was later moved to Olympic Cauldron Park and then to the Salt Lake City airport.

In July 2011, the rock band U2 concluded a nearly three-year world-wide concert tour (called "360°") that featured Hoberman's expanding video screen, a 3,800 square feet (350 m^{2}) elliptical display that would grow into a seven-story cone. The display weighed 120,000 pounds (54,000 kg), and incorporated 888 LED screens displaying a total of 500,000 pixels. The complex apparatus was successfully transported and reassembled for 110 concerts during that time.

== Toys ==
Animation of a Hoberman sphere in the form of a spherical icosidodecahedron with each of its six geodesics distinctly coloured, the grey ring viewed face on and the far hemisphere muted

In addition to toys such as the Hoberman sphere, Hoberman created the "Brain Twist", a hard plastic tetrahedron that folds, stellates, and becomes self-dual while having a component that rotates similarly to a Rubik's Cube. Likewise, Hoberman's "Pocket Flight Ring" is a folding, throwable toy resembling a chakram. Hoberman has also created the Expandagon Construction System, a kind of construction toy, and the Switch Pitch, a toy which turns itself inside out when tossed into the air, thus appearing to change colors.

== Awards and honors ==
In 1994, the Museum of Modern Art added the Hoberman sphere into its permanent collection. Hoberman won the Chrysler Design Award for Innovation and Design in 1997 and was a finalist for the 2000 Smithsonian National Design Award. He shared the LDI2009 Award for Excellence in Video Design and Technology for the U2360 expanding video screen.

In 2016, he was appointed the Pierce Anderson Lecturer in Design Engineering at Harvard University. In 2018, he received an honorary Doctor of Fine Arts degree from the Fashion Institute of Technology.

== Business ==
In 1990, he formed Hoberman Associates. In 1995, he co-founded Hoberman Designs with his wife and business partner, Carolyn Hoberman.

=== Patents ===
Hoberman has been granted numerous US and foreign patents. These include:

- Reversibly expandable doubly-curved truss structure, (1990).
- Radial expansion/retraction truss structures, (1991).
- Curved pleated sheet structures, (1993).
- Reversibly expandable structures having polygon links, (2000).
- Continuously rotating mechanisms, (2001).
- Retractable structures composed of interlinked panels, (2004).
- Folding covering panels for expanding structures, (2004).
- Loop assemblies having a central link, (2006).
- Transforming puzzle, (2006).
- Geared expanding structures, (2008).
- Synchronized ring linkages, (2009).
- Panel assemblies for variable shading and ventilation, (2009).
- Covering structure having links and stepped overlapping panels, (2009).
- Synchronized four-bar linkages, (2010).
- Panel assemblies having controllable surface properties, (2013).

== Exhibitions ==
- Projects 45: Chuck Hoberman, MoMA, New York (1994)
- Living Form, The Building Centre, London (2011)
- Archaeology of the Digital, Canadian Centre for Architecture, Montreal (2013)
- Kids Build, Canadian Centre for Architecture, Montreal (2016)
- 10° – Chuck Hoberman, Wyss Institute, Cambridge, Massachusetts (2017)

== See also ==
- Hoberman mechanism
- Hoberman sphere
