= Hoberman sphere =

Structure that resembles a geodesic dome

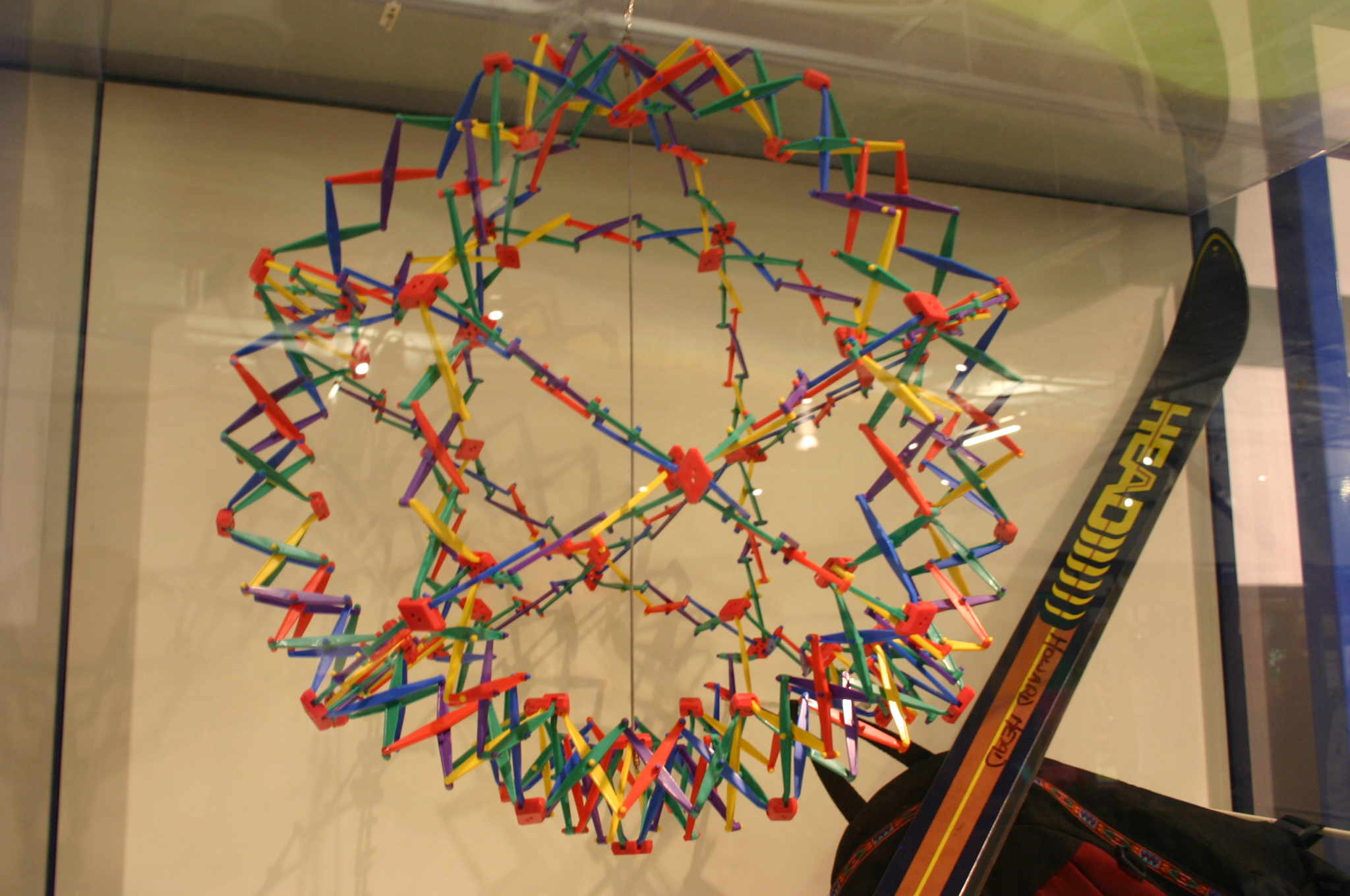
A Hoberman Sphere at the National Museum of American History

Animation of a Hoberman sphere in the form of a spherical icosidodecahedron with each of its six geodesics distinctly coloured, the grey ring viewed face on and the far hemisphere muted

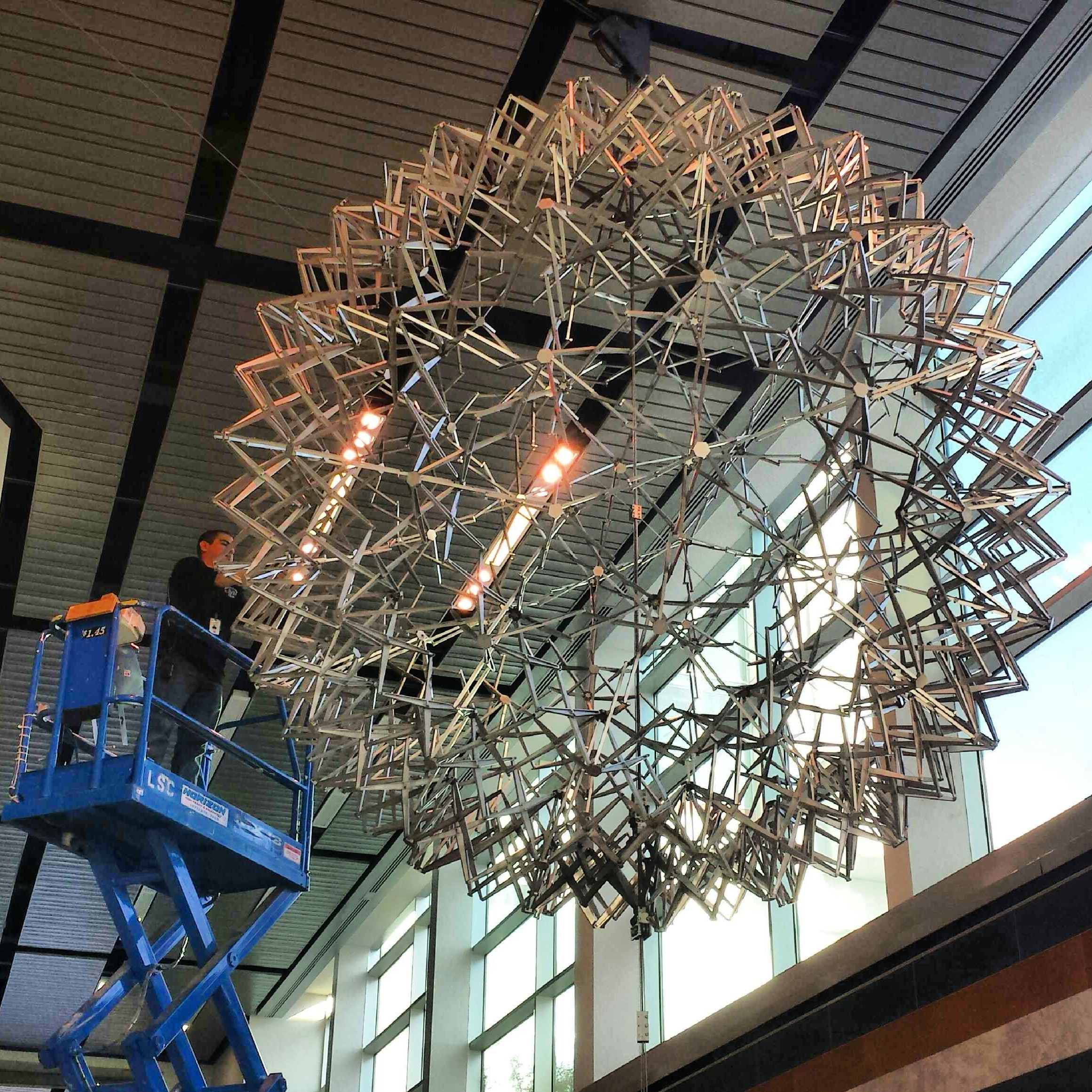
Second largest Hoberman sphere in the world, undergoing maintenance at Liberty Science Center

A Hoberman sphere is a kinetic structure patented by Chuck Hoberman that resembles a geodesic dome, but is capable of folding down to a fraction of its normal size by the scissor-like action of its joints. Colorful plastic versions have become popular as children's toys: several toy sizes exist, with the original design capable of expanding from 5.9 inches (15 cm) in diameter to 30 inches (76 cm).

== Description ==
A Hoberman sphere typically consists of six great circles corresponding to the edges of an icosidodecahedron. The Hoberman sphere can be unfolded by allowing certain members to spread apart. The operation of each joint is linked to all the others in a scissors mechanism like those used to mount pantograph mirrors, or how a folding chair operates. In larger models, this can be accomplished by feeding out a string or cable instead.

The largest existing Hoberman sphere is in the AHHAA Science Center in Tartu, Estonia. Fully expanded, it is 5.9 metres (19 ft) in diameter. The motorized sphere weighs 340 kilograms (750 lb), is constructed of aircraft-grade aluminum, and continually oscillates between its compact and expanded states. The sphere is suspended above the center's Science Court and is actuated with a computer-based motion control system. This system opens and closes the sphere in a programmed series of lyrical motions choreographed to music, lighting and special effects.

An earlier, similar but slightly smaller Hoberman sphere is in the atrium of Liberty Science Center in Jersey City, New Jersey. The 700-pound (320 kg) sphere, when fully expanded, measures 18 feet (5.5 m) in diameter.

In 1993 a smaller geodesic sphere was installed at the Swiss Science Center Technorama in Winterthur, Switzerland.

== See also ==
- Hoberman mechanism
