= Olympic and Paralympic Cauldron Plaza (Salt Lake City) =

Plaza in Salt Lake City, Utah, U.S.

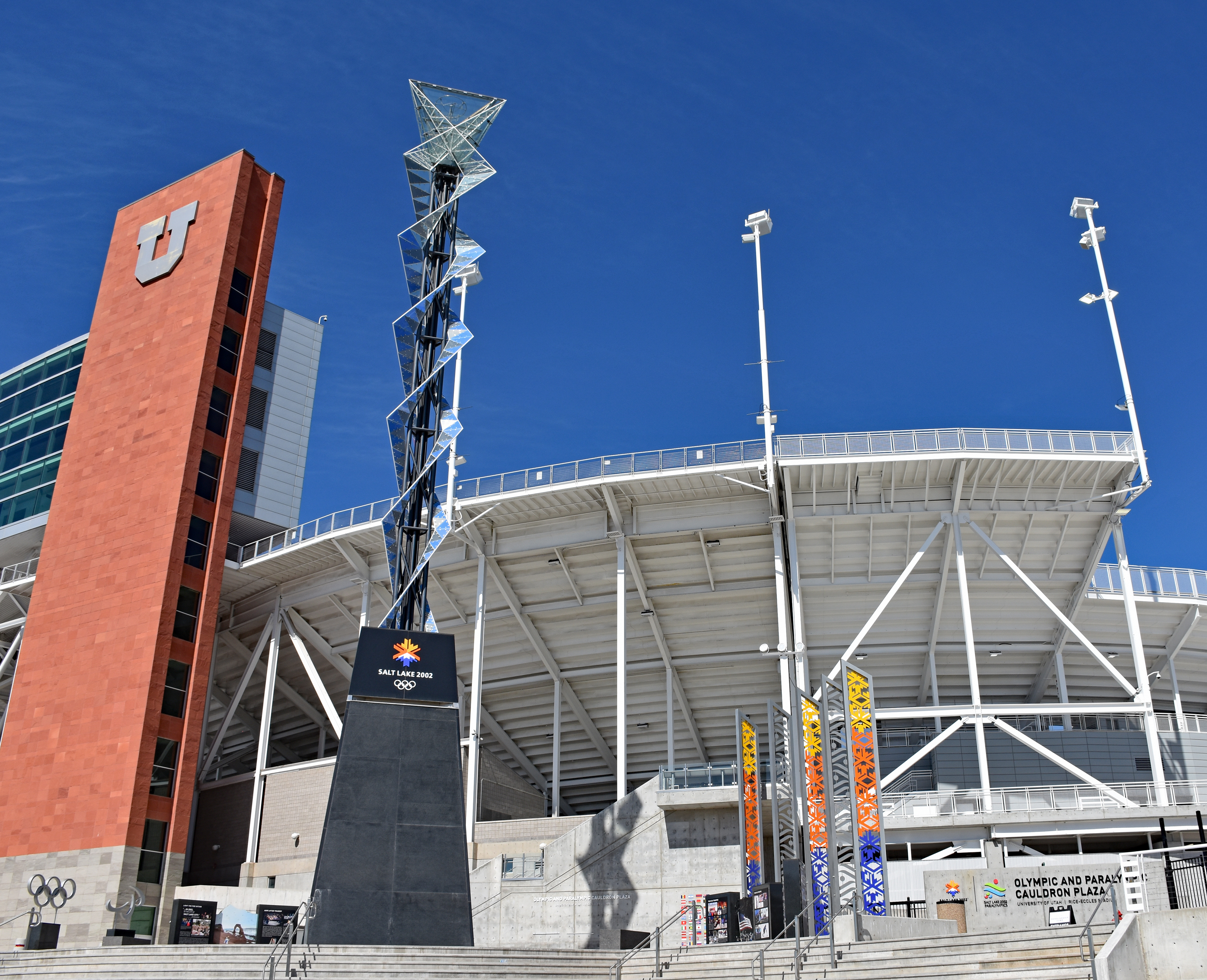
- Olympic and Paralympic Cauldron Plaza
- Interactive map of Olympic and Paralympic; Cauldron Plaza
- Location: Salt Lake City, Utah
- Coordinates: 40.759176°N 111.850073°W
- Created: 2003; Reconfigured 2021
- Operator: University of Utah
- Status: Open Year round

The Olympic and Paralympic Cauldron Plaza is located outside the southwestern corner of Rice–Eccles Stadium on the campus of the University of Utah in Salt Lake City, Utah. During the 2002 Winter Olympics and Paralympics, the stadium was known as Rice-Eccles Olympic Stadium and hosted the Opening and Closing Ceremonies. Currently, the plaza contains the 2002 Winter Olympics cauldron surrounded by several plaques displaying photographs and information related to the 2002 Games.

In 2003, the "Salt Lake 2002 Olympic Cauldron Park" was opened at the southern end of Rice-Eccles Stadium, near where the cauldron had stood during the Games. The park contained the cauldron, the Hoberman Arch, and other features such as a visitor center. Overtime, features of the park became disused and some were removed. In 2018, the University of Utah announced it would be expanding the stadium south, requiring the park to be eliminated and the cauldron relocated. The cauldron was removed for refurbishment in 2020, before being installed in the new Olympic and Paralympic Cauldron Plaza, which was unveiled October 29, 2021.

== Plaza history ==
=== Original park ===
Construction on the park began October 2, 2002 with a ground-breaking ceremony attended by Olympians Shannon Bahrke and Bill Schuffenhauer. The first phase of construction, which included installing the cauldron and making it operational, was completed in February 2003–in time for the one-year anniversary celebration. The second phase, which included the visitors center, was completed later that summer, with a ribbon-cutting ceremony held August 22, 2003. The park cost $12 million to construction, which was paid for with revenue and surplus from the 2002 Games. Following the park's opening, the Salt Lake Organizing Committee (SLOC) turned over control and maintenance of the park to the University of Utah, providing them a $1 million endowment.

The park contained three main highlights: the cauldron, the Hoberman Arch and the visitor center. The park was landscaped with a water feature, plants, stones, and concrete walls. 17 panels—one for each day of the Olympics—were attached to a fence on the park's southern edge. The interior side of each panel described the Olympic highlights and events of its particular day, while the exterior sides bore the same images that were wrapped on buildings in downtown Salt Lake City during the Games. The park (although surrounded by an often locked fence) was open to the public free of charge, with the exception of the film shown in the visitor center. Money from ticket sales for the film, along with the original $1 million endowment helped pay the park's operating costs.

=== Olympic and Paralympic Cauldron Plaza ===
As part of an expansion to Rice-Eccles Stadium, plans were developed to remove the park and reinstall the cauldron at a new plaza. The cauldron was removed in February 2020 to undergo a refurbishment. The following year it was installed in the new plaza, which was officially unveiled to the public on October 29, 2021, with athletes Catherine Raney-Norman and Chris Waddell in attendance.

The new plaza allows for unrestricted public access to the base of cauldron and features eight monuments telling the comprehensive story of the Games with photographs and information plaques.

== Features ==
=== Current ===
==== 2002 Cauldron ====
During the games, the Olympic flame burned within the cauldron, which stood above the stadium's southern stands. Following the games, the cauldron was installed at the park and made operational in time for a ceremonial lighting on the first anniversary of the Games. The cauldron, which included a water feature around its base, continued to be lit on special occasions, including the 10th and 20th anniversary of the Games in 2012 and 2022, respectively, and the awarding of the 2034 Games to Salt Lake City in 2024.

To accommodate expansion of Rice-Eccles Stadium, the cauldron was removed from the park on February 14, 2020, and taken to an off-site location where it underwent a refurbishment. The refurbishment included replacing all 738 panes of glass, wiring the structure with LED lights, and replacing the flame mechanisms to improve energy efficiency. The cauldron was installed atop a new pedestal in the plaza, just north of the ticket office (originally constructed as the original park's visitor center), on January 29, 2021.

=== Former ===
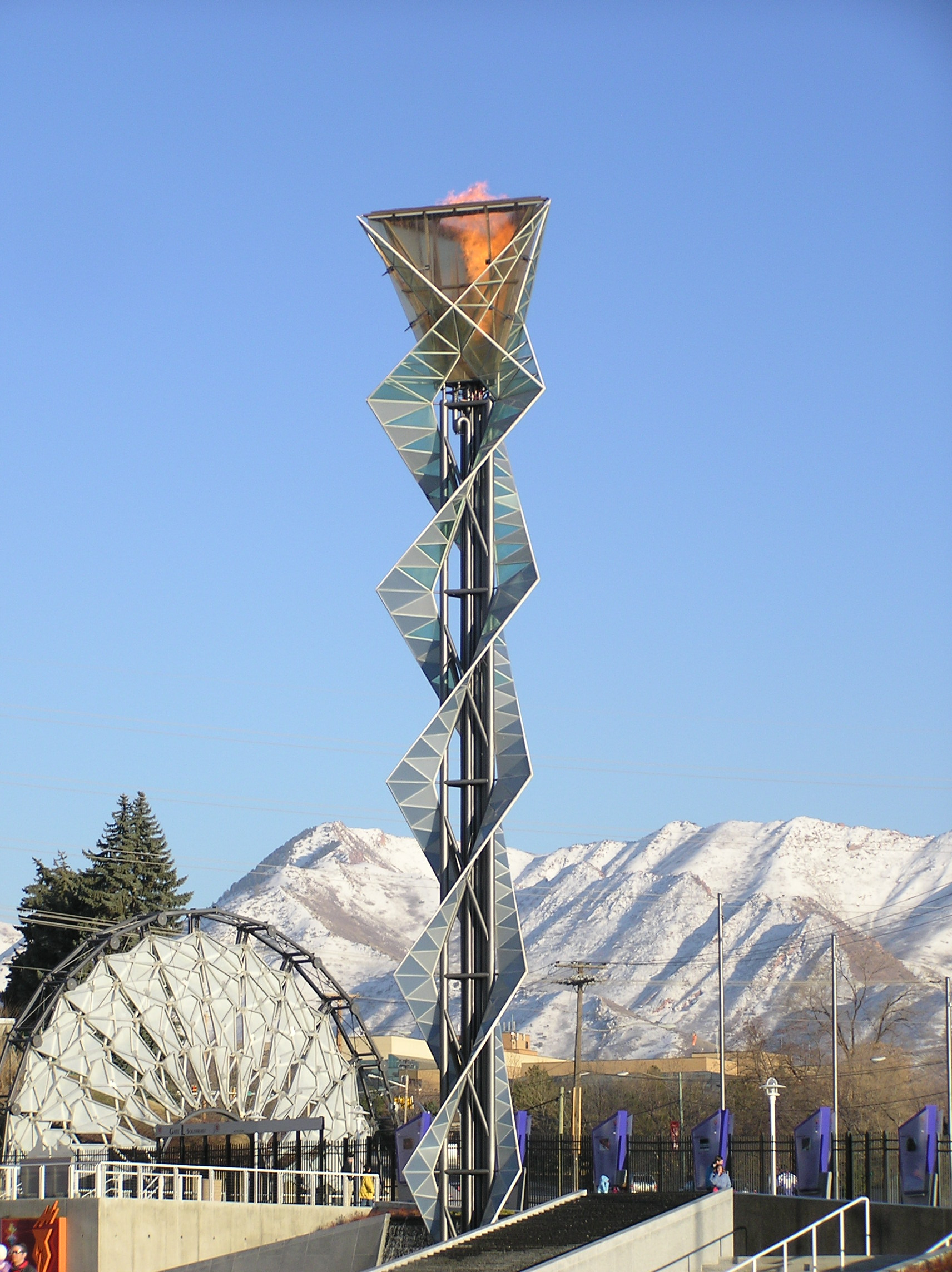
The cauldron and arch as seen in the former park during 2006.

==== Hoberman Arch ====
The Hoberman Arch was located at the Olympic Medals Plaza in downtown Salt Lake City during the Games. It was used as a mechanical curtain for the Medal Plaza's stage, and opened like the iris of a human eye. While in use at the medals plaza, it would open to reveal a large 3D sculpture of the 2002 Olympic logo and a second Olympic cauldron, known as the Hero's Cauldron. The stage not only hosted award ceremonies, where the athletes received their medals, but was used as a concert venue during the Olympics, hosting many performing artists.

Following the Olympics, plans to install the arch in some kind of park were formulated; many of Salt Lake's citizens wanted the arch to be used in an amphitheater or some kind of concert venue. But, because the arch was a symbol of the 2002 Games, the United States Olympic Committee put restrictions on possible future locations for the arch (to protect Olympic sponsors from other businesses who don't have Olympic sponsor contracts). Because of these restrictions, and a lack of consensus among Salt Lake's leaders on where it would go, SLOC announced plans on December 5, 2002, to install the arch in the Salt Lake 2002 Olympic Cauldron Park.

On July 30, 2003, the arch was lifted onto its new base at the park using three cranes. While at the cauldron park, it was no longer functional, although was lit with various colored lights at night. It was located just outside the park's southern fence and was partly open which allowed visitors to walk through it. A large plaque was located in front of the arch, which provided details on the arch's design and use during the Olympics, including photographs.

The arch was removed from the park beginning on August 1, 2014.

==== Visitor center ====
The park's visitors center was located at the western edge of the park and consisted of an art gallery, theater, and video kiosk area. Large bay windows allowed the cauldron and arch to be seen by visitors from inside the round glass and sandstone building, which also served as a ticket office for the nearby stadium (and continues in that capacity).

The center's theater used to play a 10-minute film which looked back on the Games and their success. This film was displayed using three different screens and special effects such as fog and lights; there was a charge to see the center's film. The presentation began in the dark, while inspiring quotes were played through the theater's sound system. Fog then filled the room, and a single light was displayed on the screens. As that light grew larger, it turned out to be the lantern of a skater, known as the "Child of Light" from the opening ceremony. Skaters were then seen whooshing across the three screens, and a voice sung "there's a flame that burns in every heart"; the athletes were then shown entering the stadium for the opening ceremonies. The film continued with highlights from the opening ceremony, the sporting competitions, and ended with the closing ceremony.

The free areas of the center included the art gallery, which contained more than 50 photographs taken during the Games (originally printed in the Games' official commemorative book), and filmed highlights were available for viewing on interactive kiosks.

== See also ==
- Olympic Legacy Plaza, another Olympic heritage plaza in Salt Lake City
