= Venues of the 2002 Winter Olympics =

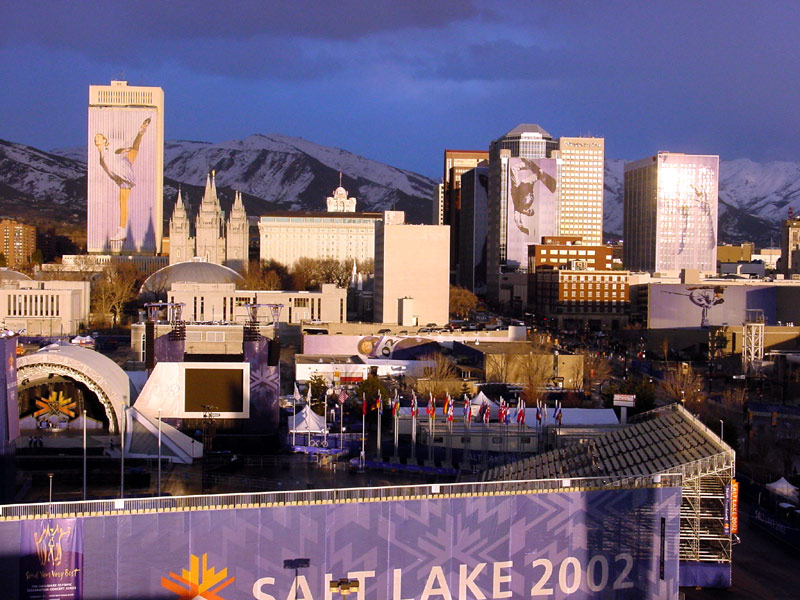
Downtown Salt Lake City during the 2002 Winter Olympics

The 2002 Winter Olympic Games were held in and around Salt Lake City, United States from February 8 to 24, 2002, and the Paralympics from March 7 to 16, 2002. The sporting events were held in ten competitive venues, while non-competitive events, such as the opening ceremony, were held in six other venues. Three venues were also created for training purposes. All Olympic venues were scattered throughout Northern Utah and the Wasatch Front.

In November 1989, Utah's voters passed the Olympic referendum, which allowed construction to begin on a few of the future Olympic venues with the 1998 Winter Olympics on the mind. The construction was to proceed using public funds which would be repaid with profits following the games. As part of the referendum, the state created the Utah Sports Authority, who would work closely with the Salt Lake Olympic Bid Committee and other Olympic organizers to ensure the venues complied with Olympic standards. Two years later, Salt Lake City lost its bid to host the 1998 Winter Olympics, but the plans continued. By the time Salt Lake City bid again, the venues had been completed in 1995. On June 16, 1995, the International Olympic Committee awarded Salt Lake City the XIX Winter Olympics, with the newly completed venues cited as one of the key factors in the successful bid.

The Utah Sports Authority constructed two of the Olympic venues: the Utah Olympic Park and Utah Olympic Oval. Prior to the games, the authority turned over ownership of the venues to the Salt Lake 2002 Organizing Committee (SLOC), who turned the ownership of the venues over to the Utah Athletic Foundation after the games.

== Competitive Venues ==
=== Deer Valley Resort ===
The Deer Valley Resort is located 36 miles (58 km) east of downtown Salt Lake City, in Park City, Utah. Deer Valley has been a popular skiing location since the 1930s, and was improved by the Works Progress Administration (WPA) who built many of its first ski trails and other facilities during the winter of 1936–37. In 1946, local citizens built the first ski lifts, and the area became known as "Snow Park". In 1981, a private resort officially opened in the same area as Deer Valley, and has grown to include six mountains with six bowls, 930 acres (380 ha) of glade skiing and 560 acres (230 ha) of snow-making. The resort totals 2,026 acres (820 ha) in size.

During the 2002 games, Deer Valley Resort hosted the freestyle moguls and aerials and alpine slalom events. Three of the resort's runs were used during the games, including "Champion" (site of freestyle moguls), "Know You Don't" (site of alpine slalom), and "White Owl" (site of freestyle aerials). The spectator stadium located at the end of each run was 12 stories tall and included seating for 10,000 people, while spectator standing areas were located along the sides of each course. The standing areas and stadium combined allowed roughly 13,300 spectators to view each event, with 99.4 percent of tickets sold. During the games, 95 percent of Deer Valley remained open to the public for normal seasonal operations.

=== E Center ===
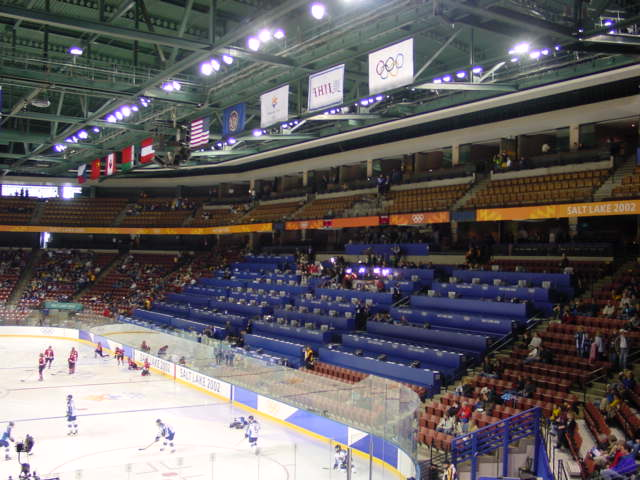
Interior of E Center during the Olympic Games

Originally known as the E Center, the Maverik Center is located 9 miles (14 km) west of downtown Salt Lake City in West Valley City. In July 1995, only a month after winning the Olympic bid, SLOC accepted a proposal from West Valley City to build a new ice hockey facility in the city. SLOC loaned $7 million to the city for construction costs, and would rent the arena from the city during the games. The arena would be funded through a variety of ways, but would be owned the municipality of West Valley City, and used for various events before and after the games. Ground was broken for the E Center on March 22, 1996, and the arena was completed in September 1997. The arena was designed by Populous (formerly HOK Sport), cost $54.1 million to construct, and was dedicated on September 19, 1997. The first event held at the new venue was WCW's Monday Nitro Live on September 22, 1997.

As the home of the Utah Grizzlies, the E Center served as one of the two venues for ice hockey during the 2002 games. The hockey events held in the venue were spread out during six days in 31 sessions, and it was capable of holding 8,400 spectators, plus press members, during the competitions. 96.7 percent of available tickets were sold, for a total of 230,657 spectators witnessing events in the arena. During the 2002 Winter Paralympics, the arena hosted the ice sledge hockey events.

=== Park City Mountain Resort ===
Park City Mountain Resort is located 34 miles (55 km) east of downtown Salt Lake City, in Park City, Utah. It was opened as Treasure Mountain by United Park City Mines on December 21, 1963, as the last surviving mining company in Park City, with funds from a federal government program meant to revive the economically depressed town. When it originally opened, it boasted the longest gondola in the United States, as well as a double chairlift, a J-bar lift, base and summit lodges, and a nine-hole golf course. A special "Skier's Subway" was used to transport skiers nearly 2.5 miles (4.0 km) into the mountain through the pitch-black Spiro Tunnel on a mine train, where skiers then boarded a mining elevator that lifted them 1,750 feet (530 m) to the surface, from there they had access to the entire mountain. Treasure Mountain's name was changed to the Park City Ski Area for its fourth season of 1966–67, and it eventually became known as the Park City Mountain Resort. The resort has grown to include eight peaks and nine bowls, with 3,300 acres (13 km^{2}) of skiing and 16 lifts.

During the 2002 games, the resort hosted the men's and women's giant slalom, men's and women's snowboarding parallel giant slalom, and men's and women's snowboarding halfpipe events. The resort's Eagle Race Arena and Eagle Superpipe were used as the Olympics runs. Temporary stadiums were erected at the end of each run with spectator standing areas on each side, creating a combined capacity of 16,500 persons. 99.8 percent of available tickets for events at the resort were sold, for a total of 95,991 spectators witnessing events at the resort. During the games, 96 percent of the resort was open to normal seasonal operations, and was the only venue to allow spectators to leave and reenter.

=== Peaks Ice Arena ===
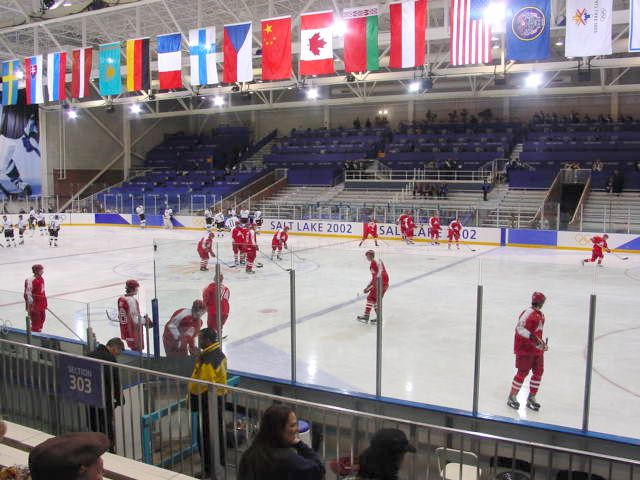
Olympic hockey game inside the Peaks Ice Arena

Peaks Ice Arena is located 43 miles (69 km) south of downtown Salt Lake City, in Provo, Utah. Provo was chosen as the site for an Olympic venue because the leaders of Utah County refused to support Utah's 1989 Olympic referendum unless they were promised at least one Olympic event would be held in the county. Originally, county leaders wanted the speed skating oval built somewhere in Provo, or on the campus of Utah Valley Community College; others suggested the Games' closing ceremony be held at Brigham Young University's Cougar Stadium. After the 1989 Olympic referendum passed and Salt Lake City lost its 1991 bid to host the 1998 Winter Olympics, the Utah Sports Authority and Provo City decided to wait until Salt Lake City bid again for the 2002 Winter Olympics before beginning construction on the arena.

After Salt Lake City won the 2002 Olympic bid in 1995, planning began again for what venue Utah County would host, and an ice sheet was decided upon. On September 17, 1997, ground was broken for construction of the new arena. It was to be a 80,400-square-foot (7,470 m^{2}) building, with two ice sheets side by side. One ice sheet would have seating for about 2,000 spectators while the other would seat 300. By the time ground was broken, the price had increased to $8.5 million, $1.5 million more than originally planned, paid for by Seven Peaks. After construction had already begun, the SLOC decided to host hockey events at the new arena rather than using Utah Valley State College's McKay Center. The SLOC would contribute $5.25 million towards the project, whose cost had just jumped to $10.75 million, with the addition of 12 locker rooms instead of four, 8,000 seats (2,300 of which would be permanent), and other minor expansions to the original plan.

The arena opened November 20, 1998, in what was considered a "soft opening", and following the completion of minor work, the arena was supposed to have a grand opening in January or February 1999. In December 1998, however, allegations of a scandal involving members of the SLOC and the International Olympic Committee concerning the 2002 Olympic bid surfaced, pushing back the grand opening. The arena was finally opened on September 29, 1999, and hosted its first event, a women's ice hockey game between the University of Minnesota Duluth Bulldogs and the University of Calgary Oval Extremes, two days later. The completed arena cost $12.4 million to build, included two ice sheets, had seating for over 2,000 spectators, and was 110,000 square feet (10,000 m^{2}) in size.

During the 2002 games, both men's and women's ice hockey games and practices were held at the arena. Because of its original size, over 6,000 temporary seats had to be installed to boost the ice center's capacity to 8,400, including press members. 93 percent of tickets were sold, for a record total 131,067 of spectators witnessing events in the arena.

=== Salt Lake Ice Center ===
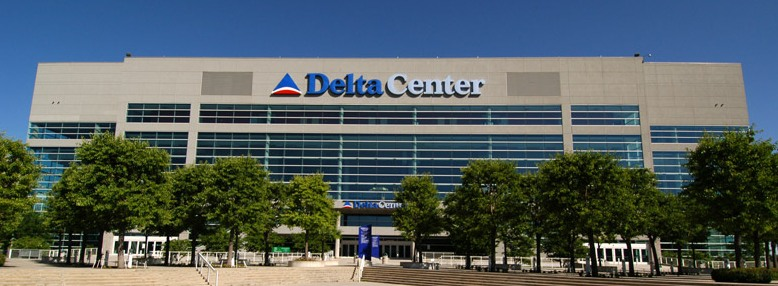
Delta Center in 2005.

The Delta Center (renamed Salt Lake Ice Center for the duration of the Games due to IOC sponsorship rules) opened in 1991 as the new home arena for the Utah Jazz of the National Basketball Association (NBA).

It hosted the figure skating events and the short track speed skating event. The arena was capable of holding an average of 14,600 spectators for each session, and 100 percent of available tickets for events in the arena were sold, for a total of 145,997 spectators witnessing events in the Ice Center. Because it was normally a basketball arena, several changes to the floor, and seating configurations had to be made. In order to create an Olympic-sized ice rink, the lower levels of seating had to be retracted, making the first level of spectator seating several feet higher than the skater's heads, a problem coined "the Pit". The Utah Jazz played their last home game on February 2, 2002, giving organizers less than a week to transform the arena in time for the games. Temporary changes included a separate audio system capable of producing higher quality sound, new scoreboards, the removal of 1,200 seats to make room for media tables, building camera platforms, and the removal of Utah Jazz paraphernalia.

=== Snowbasin ===
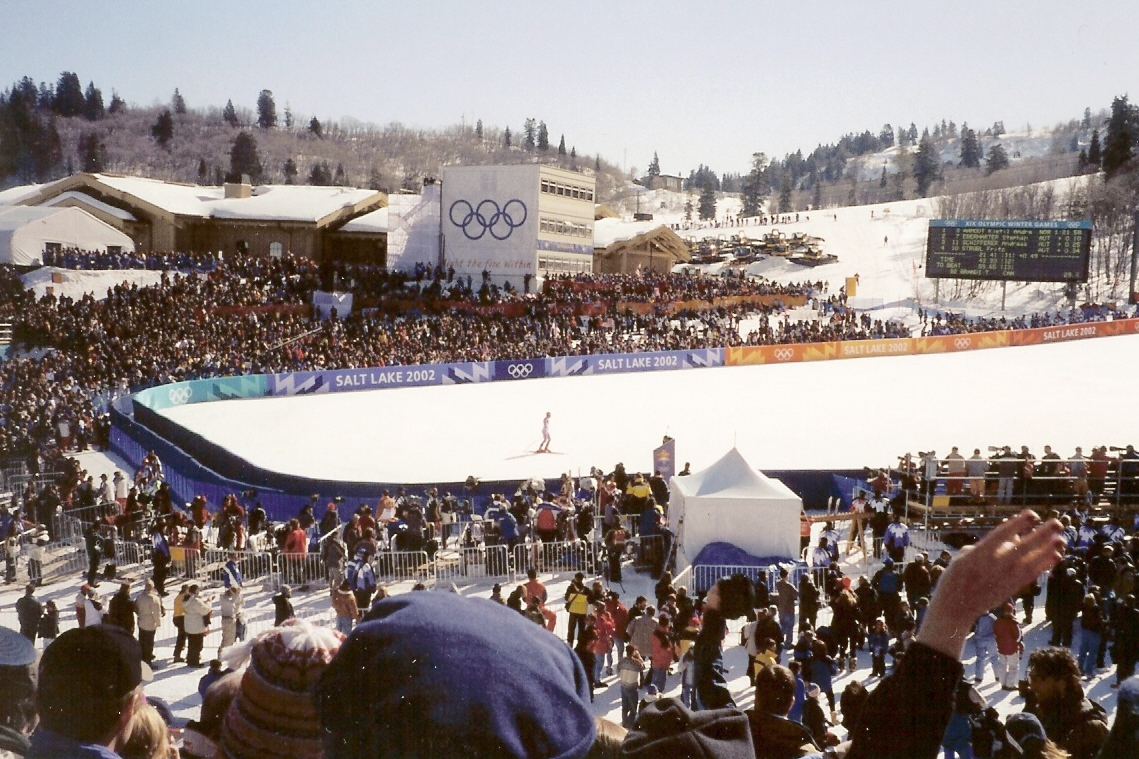
Men's super-G at Snowbasin

Snowbasin is located 33 miles (53 km) northeast of downtown Salt Lake City, in Weber County, Utah, and is one of the oldest continuously operating ski areas in the United States. Following the end of World War I and the Great Depression, numerous small ski resorts were developed in Utah's snow-packed mountains. Eager to capitalize on this growth, Weber County decided to redevelop the area in and around Wheeler Basin, a deteriorated watershed area that had been overgrazed and subjected to aggressive timber-harvesting. Lands were restored and turned over to the US Forest Service, and by 1938, the Forest Service and Alf Engen had committed to turning the area into a recreational site. In 1939, the first ski tow was built and in service at the new Snow Basin ski park. Over the past 70 years, the resort has grown to include 115 runs, 13 lifts, and 3,000 acres (12 km^{2}) of Skiable area.

During the 2002 games, Snowbasin hosted the downhill, combined (downhill and slalom), and super-G events. The spectator viewing areas consisted of a stadium at the foot of the run, with two sections of snow terraces for standing along both sides of the run. The spectator capacity was 22,500 per event; 99.1 percent of tickets were sold, and 124,373 spectators were able to view events at the Snowbasin Olympic venue. During the 2002 Winter Paralympics, Snowbasin hosted the Alpine Skiing events, including downhill, super-G, slalom, and giant slalom.

=== Soldier Hollow ===
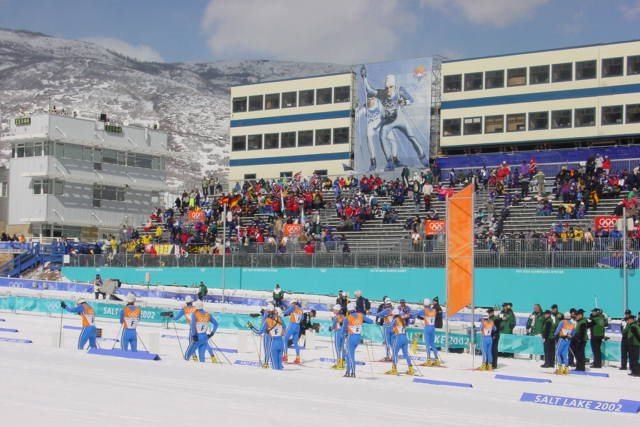
A cross-country event at Soldier Hollow

Soldier Hollow is located 53 miles (85 km) southeast of downtown Salt Lake City, in the Wasatch Mountain State Park near Midway, Utah. It was the furthest venue from Salt Lake City, with an estimated drive time of 2 to 2 1/2 hours from downtown during the games. The venue was one of only three which was built and designed by SLOC specifically for the 2002 Winter Olympics. Soldier Hollow was chosen by the SLOC as an Olympic venue in October 1997 over several other possible locations including Sherwood Hills near Logan, Utah. Preliminary work began soon after the venue site was chosen, but major construction did not begin until 1999. Construction on the venue had been completed enough (80% complete) to host its first major event, the U.S. Cross Country Championships, on January 8, 2000. Construction on the venue's day lodge began with a groundbreaking ceremony on July 5, 2000. The lodge was completed in December 2000, and dedicated on January 5, 2001. The venue cost SLOC $22 million to construct, and is still in use today.

During the 2002 games, Soldier Hollow hosted the biathlon, cross-country skiing, and Nordic combined events. The venue itself hosted 64,160 biathlon spectators, 99,320 cross-country spectators, and 1,794 Nordic combined spectators during these events. During the 2002 Winter Paralympics, it hosted the biathlon and cross-country events.

Because of its distance from Salt Lake City and other large population centers of Utah, a special "Western Experience" was created at the venue's spectator plaza to give visitors activities to do between competitions. The Western Experience included music and entertainment, a mountain rendezvous, pioneer reenactments, cowboy camps, a wild mustang exhibit, and American Indian displays.

In order to help cut down on vehicle traffic in the canyons, and to give spectators a unique experience, the SLOC reached an agreement with the Historic Heber Valley Railroad to transport spectators to the Soldier Hollow venues. A special station was constructed along the railroad's tracks near the venue which would allow two to four trains carrying 200 passengers each per day. The former Union Pacific No. 618 steam-engine would pull an eight-car train carrying the passengers to the Soldier Hollow depot, where they disembarked and continued to the venue entrance on a horse-drawn sleigh.

=== The Ice Sheet at Ogden ===
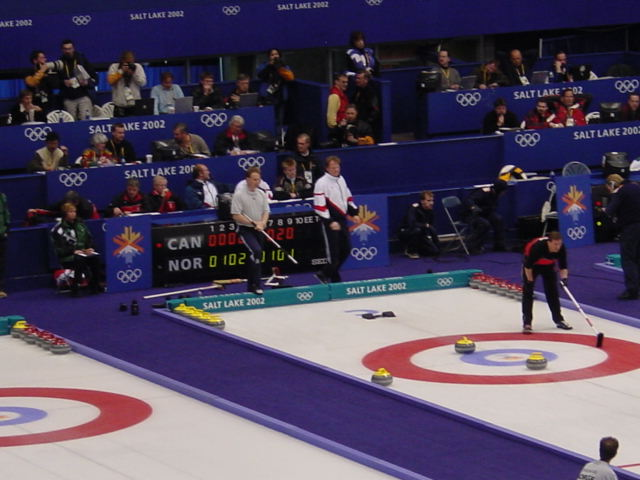
2002 Olympic curling competitions inside the Ice Sheet

The Ice Sheet at Ogden is located 35 miles (56 km) north of downtown Salt Lake City, on the campus of Weber State University in Ogden, Utah. Following the passage of Utah's 1989 Olympic referendum, Ogden submitted a proposal to the Utah Sports Authority and Utah's Olympic organizers to construct an Olympic-sized practice ice sheet in the city. On September 10, 1990, the Utah Sports Authority selected a site near the Dee Events Center in Ogden as the site of an Olympic ice sheet over other locations in downtown Salt Lake City and Provo, Utah. The property for the venue would be leased from Weber State University for 50 years. A groundbreaking ceremony at the start of construction was held on December 17, 1992. The facility was to cost $5.9 million, with $3 million from the State of Utah (as authorized in the 1989 Olympic referendum), $2 million from Weber County, and the remainder from private donations. Following the venue's completion, a two-day grand opening was held on April 2–3, 1994, which included performances by Olympian Scott Hamilton and U.S. Champions Todd Sands and Jennifer Menno. By the time it was completed, the price had gone up to $6.2 million, and the arena had seating for 2,000 spectators and was 52,500 square feet (4,900 m^{2}) in size. It was originally designed to be used for practice and preliminary competitions among ice skaters and hockey teams for the 2002 Winter Olympics. It was later decided that the ice sheet would be used for curling, and the ice sheet closed to replace the sand-based floor with a more efficient concrete floor on May 2, 1999. The sand-based flooring allowed freezing tubes to shift, causing uneven ridges in the ice. The new concrete floor was finished in July 1999, and the ice sheet reopened for public use within weeks.

During the 2002 games, the Ice Sheet at Ogden hosted the curling events, which had been introduced in the 1998 Winter Olympics. The venue held about 2,000 spectators, and 96.7 percent of tickets were sold, with a total of 40,572 spectators witnessing events at the ice sheet.

=== Utah Olympic Oval ===
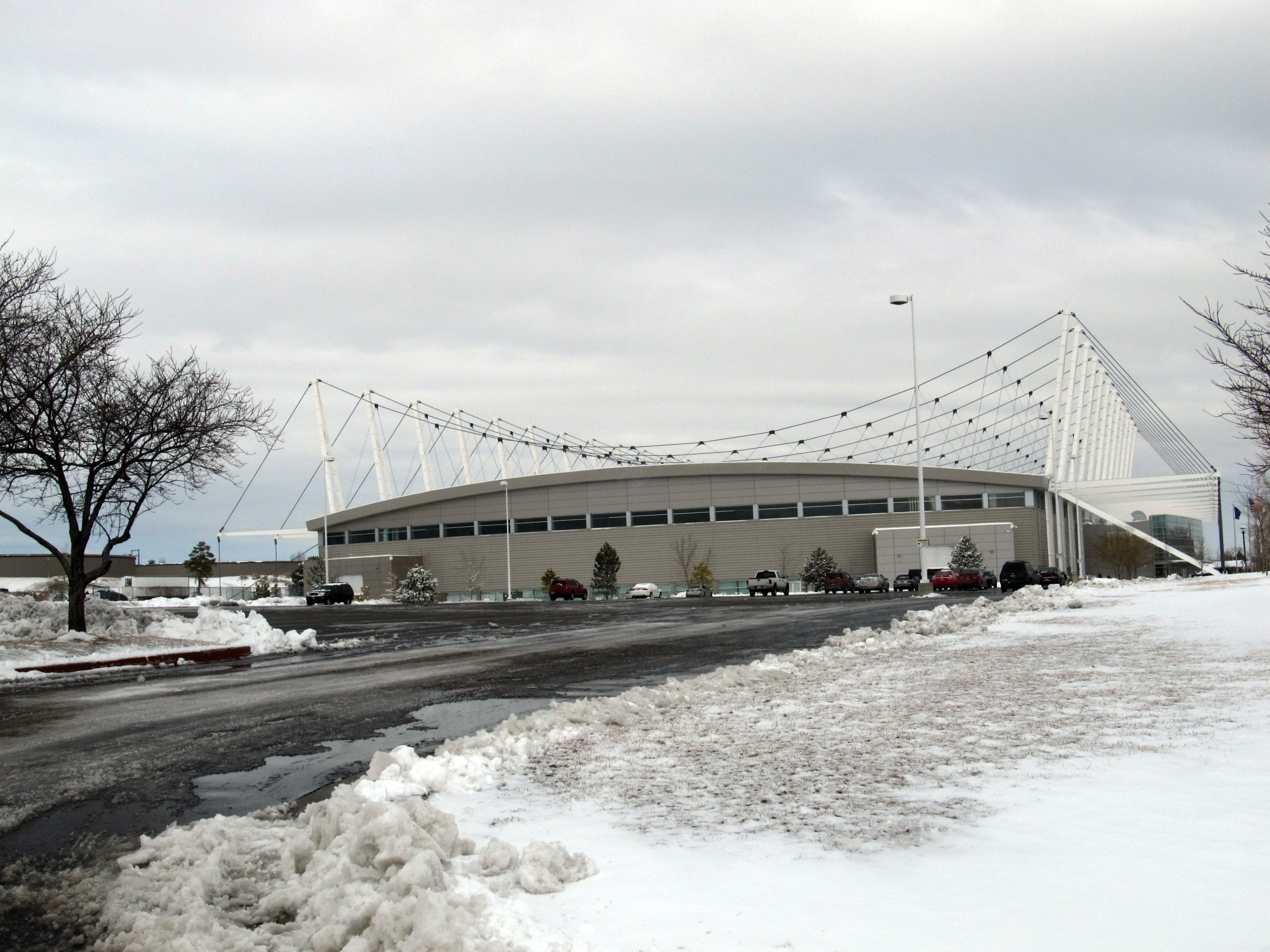
The Utah Olympic Oval in Kearns, Utah was built specifically for the 2002 Winter Olympics

The Utah Olympic Oval is located 14 miles (23 km) west of downtown Salt Lake City, in Kearns, Utah. Along with Soldier Hollow, and the Utah Olympic Park it was built specifically for the 2002 Winter Olympics. On October 5, 1992, the Utah Sports Authority chose the Oquirrh Park Fitness Center in Kearns as the site for the 2002 Olympic Oval, beating out other locations in West Valley City, Sandy and downtown Salt Lake City. Funds from the 1989 Olympic referendum would be used to construct the oval, and would be repaid with profits from the games. The plans called to use $3.7 million of tax payer money to construct the oval, which would be an outdoor facility. If Salt Lake City won its 1995 bid for the 2002 games, Olympic revenues would be used to cover the oval and build an ice sheet in the center of the track. By the time the groundbreaking ceremony was held in May 1994, the price tag had increased to $4.1 million, with an expected completion date sometime that December. Because of cold temperatures and a wet spring, cement for the oval could not be poured, and the oval didn't open until September 1, 1995, almost a year behind schedule. The oval was formally dedicated in a ceremony, attended by Olympian Cathy Turner, on January 12, 1996. Prior to it being covered and used during the Olympic Games, the oval would be used for inline skating during the summer and ice skating during the winter months.

After the SLOC began the design process for a permanent cover, it was decided to pull up and replace the entire oval, a process which began in June 1999. The new oval was designed by Gilles Stransky Brems Smith (GSBS) Architects of Salt Lake City and constructed by Layton Construction, with an estimated cost was $27 million. To keep costs down, and give an unobstructed view of the ice, the roof would be constructed similar to a suspension bridge. Between twenty-four masts, twelve on each side of the building, steel cables nearly 400 feet (120 m) long and 3 1/2 inches in diameter were strung, suspending the roof above the oval. Once it was completed, the building would be the size of four football fields, and housed two hockey-sized ice sheets in the center, the 400-meter speed skating track. Work on the oval was completed in time to host its first event, the World Single Distance Championships, in March 2001.

During its construction, the oval was expected to become the world's fastest, mainly because of its elevation. It is the world's highest indoor oval at 4,675 feet (1,425 m) above sea level, 1,000 feet (300 m) higher than Calgary's Olympic Oval, the site of the 1988 Winter Olympics. Because of the elevation, there is less air resistance for the skaters and less oxygen frozen into the ice, making it harder, denser and faster.

During the 2002 games, the oval hosted the speed skating events. Temporary seating was installed and the oval had a capacity for about 5,200 spectators plus press members. 100 percent of available tickets for the venue's events were sold, allowing 53,056 spectators to witness events in the oval.

=== Utah Olympic Park ===
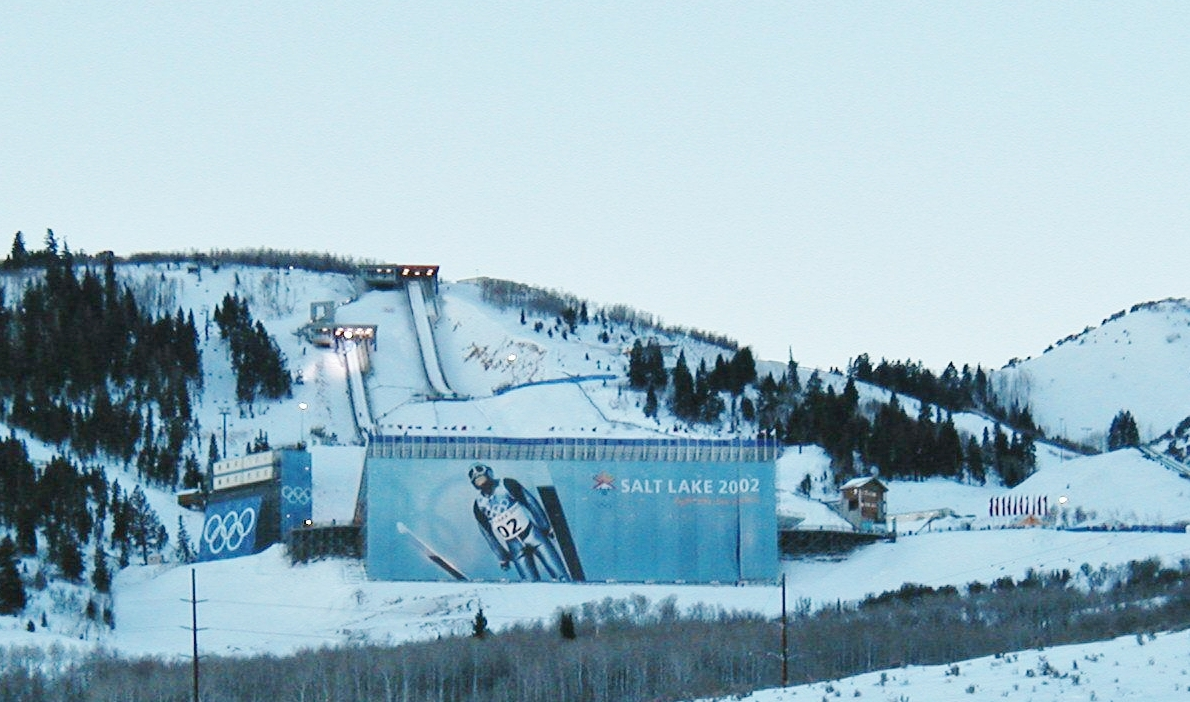
The ski jumps at Utah Olympic Park with temporary spectator seating, February 2002

The Utah Olympic Park is located 28 miles (45 km) east of downtown Salt Lake City, near Park City, Utah. Like the Utah Olympic Oval and Soldier Hollow, the park was designed and built under the supervision of SLOC. The 1989 Olympic referendum, which was passed by Utahns, allowed for tax payer money to fund a winter sports park that would be used if Salt Lake City won their bids for the 1998 or 2002 Winter Olympics. In 1990, the Utah Sports Authority announced their plans to build the park, which included ski jumps and a bobsled-luge track, in Bear Hollow near Park city. A groundbreaking ceremony was held May 29, 1991, when construction on the park got underway. The park had an estimated cost of $26.3 million, and was planned to be completed in September 1992, including the ski jumps, bobsled-luge track, a lodge and ski museum. Four of the park's ski jumps (18, 38, 65 and 90 meters) were completed and opened on December 12, 1992, and were formally dedicated in a ceremony on January 9, 1993. On July 31, 1993, the summer training facilities at the park, which included an aerial and mogul water ramp training pool, were dedicated.

A groundbreaking ceremony on June 3, 1994, signaled the start of construction on the Bobsled-luge track. The track was completed December 28, 1996, and the grand opening was held on January 25, 1997. The very first run on the new track was by luger Jon Owen on January 10, 1997. The day lodge was also completed.

While construction was progressing on the track, Salt Lake City won its 1995 bid to host the 2002 Winter Olympics, and plans were developed to expand the park. On October 9, 1997, the SLOC okayed the plan to spend an additional $48 million to upgrade and expand the park. The plans called for replacing the existing 90-meter ski jump, and building a new 120-meter jump. The construction of starting houses on the track, chairlifts, storage buildings, new access roads, pedestrian bridges, parking and sewer and water lines were part of the plan. The transform of the park began during the summer of 1998, and ownership of the park was transferred from the Utah Sports Authority to the SLOC on July 14, 1999. In Spring 2000 the Utah Winter Sports Park became the Utah Olympic Park, and the majority of expansion work was completed by that fall.

== Non-competitive venues ==
=== Main Media Center ===
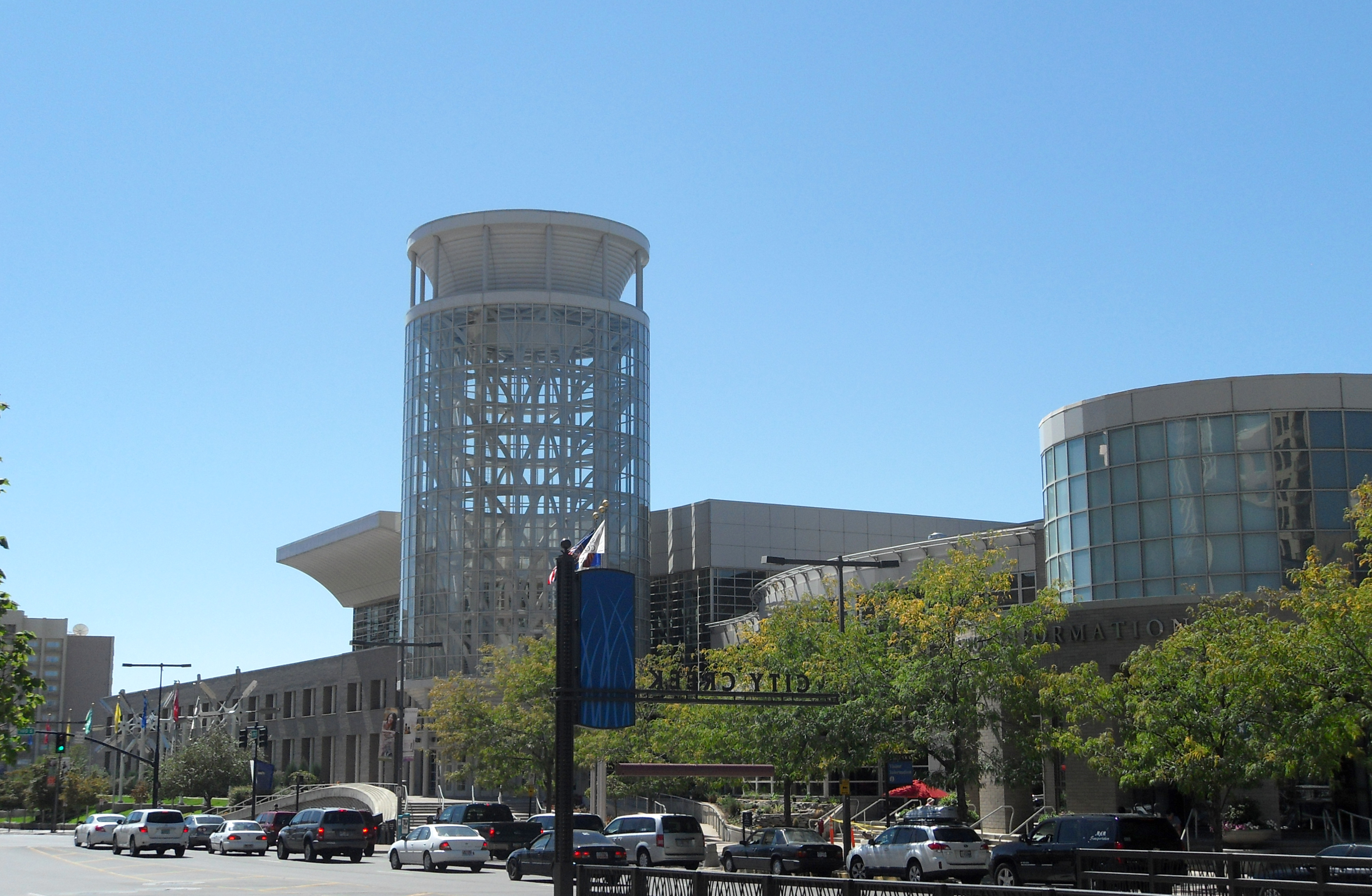
The Salt Palace, which held the MMC during the games

The Main Media Center (MMC) was located in the Salt Palace Convention Center in downtown Salt Lake City, and hosted both the International Broadcast Center (IBC) and the Main Press Center (MPC) during the games. The Salt Palace Convention Center was the second building in Salt Lake City to carry that name, the first having been destroyed by fire in 1910. The Salt Palace used during the Olympics had originally been constructed in 1969, pushed by Salt Lake's failed bid for the 1972 Winter Olympics. It was an arena with a capacity of 10,725 spectators, but after Salt Lake lost its bid, the arena became the home of the Utah Stars and the NBA's Utah Jazz. After the Utah Jazz moved next door to the newly constructed Delta Center, the majority of the Salt Palace was demolished, including the arena. What remained was remodeled and expanded to create the Convention Center used during the games.

The Main Media Center had a total of 515,000 square feet (47,800 m^{2}) of exhibit space, 164,000 square feet (15,200 m^{2}) of meeting space including a 45,000-square-foot (4,200 m^{2}) grand ballroom, and 66 meeting rooms. It had a total capacity of 20,000 people, and more than 15,534 miles (25,000 km) of fiber-optic cable installed in Salt Lake City allowed the MMC to hand 2 million inbound calls a day.

=== Olympic Medals Plaza ===
The Olympic Medals Plaza was located on the corner of South Temple and 300 West (block 85) in downtown Salt Lake City, within the Olympic Square. It was one of a few temporary venues, which was removed following the completion of both the 2002 Winter Olympics and 2002 Winter Paralympics. The site of the Medals Plaza is now a parking lot owned by the Church of Jesus Christ of Latter-day Saints and is still used for temporary events. The Church donated free use of the property for the 2002 games, along with $5 million to transform the parking lot into the Olympic Medals Plaza. On August 11, 1999, the same day the plaza's location was announced, a tornado hit downtown Salt Lake City, killing one man at the site. Some of Salt Lake's citizens, including many in its City Council, had preferred Washington Square (the site of the City & County Building) or Pioneer Park as the location for the Medals Plaza. Nevertheless, the SLOC accepted the Church's offer because they were willing to help pay the costs, and the parking lot was an entire city block in size, which would allow a largest number of spectators. Construction on the plaza began December 3, 2001, and was finished in January 25, 2002.

The plaza could hold 20,000 spectators, with 9,000 in the stands and another 11,000 in standing areas. The stage, which was centered directly in front, was kept hidden by a metal curtain known as the Hoberman Arch, and flanked by two large 22 by 30-foot (9.1 m) video screens. The stage was decorated with a large 3D version of the Olympic logo, which held the second Olympic cauldron known as the Hero's Cauldron. A large 67-foot (20 m) lighting/production tower stood directly in front of the stage, and was surrounded by the standing areas. The plaza also included an NBC studio, and a three-story building with 17 boxed suites, rented out for $92,500 each.

Every night following the presentation of the medals, an Olympic Celebration Concert would be held, and a small fireworks display would mark the end of activities. Evening celebrations were hosted by former American football player Steve Young.

The Medals Plaza also hosted the 2002 Winter Paralympics closing ceremony on March 16, 2002.

==== Olympic Celebration Series concerts ====
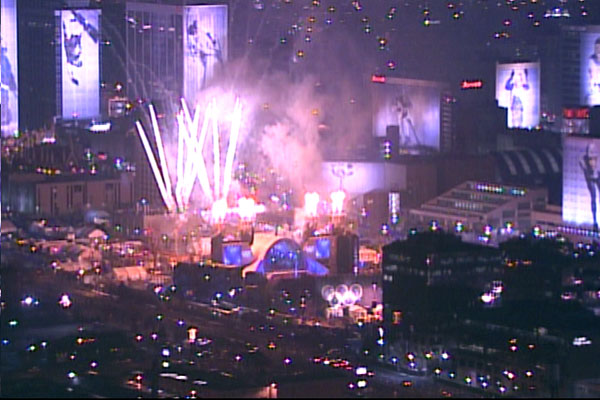
Fireworks erupt from behind the Olympic Medals Plaza in downtown Salt Lake City

Date	Performing Artist
February 9	Dave Matthews Band
February 10	Lifehouse
February 11	Foo Fighters
February 12	Macy Gray
February 13	Barenaked Ladies
February 14	Sheryl Crow
February 15	Smash Mouth
February 16	Brooks & Dunn
February 17	Train
February 18	Nelly Furtado
February 19	Creed
February 20	Marc Anthony
February 21	Alanis Morissette
February 22	Goo Goo Dolls
February 23	*NSYNC
February 24	Martina McBride
February 25	The Temptations

=== Olympic Village ===
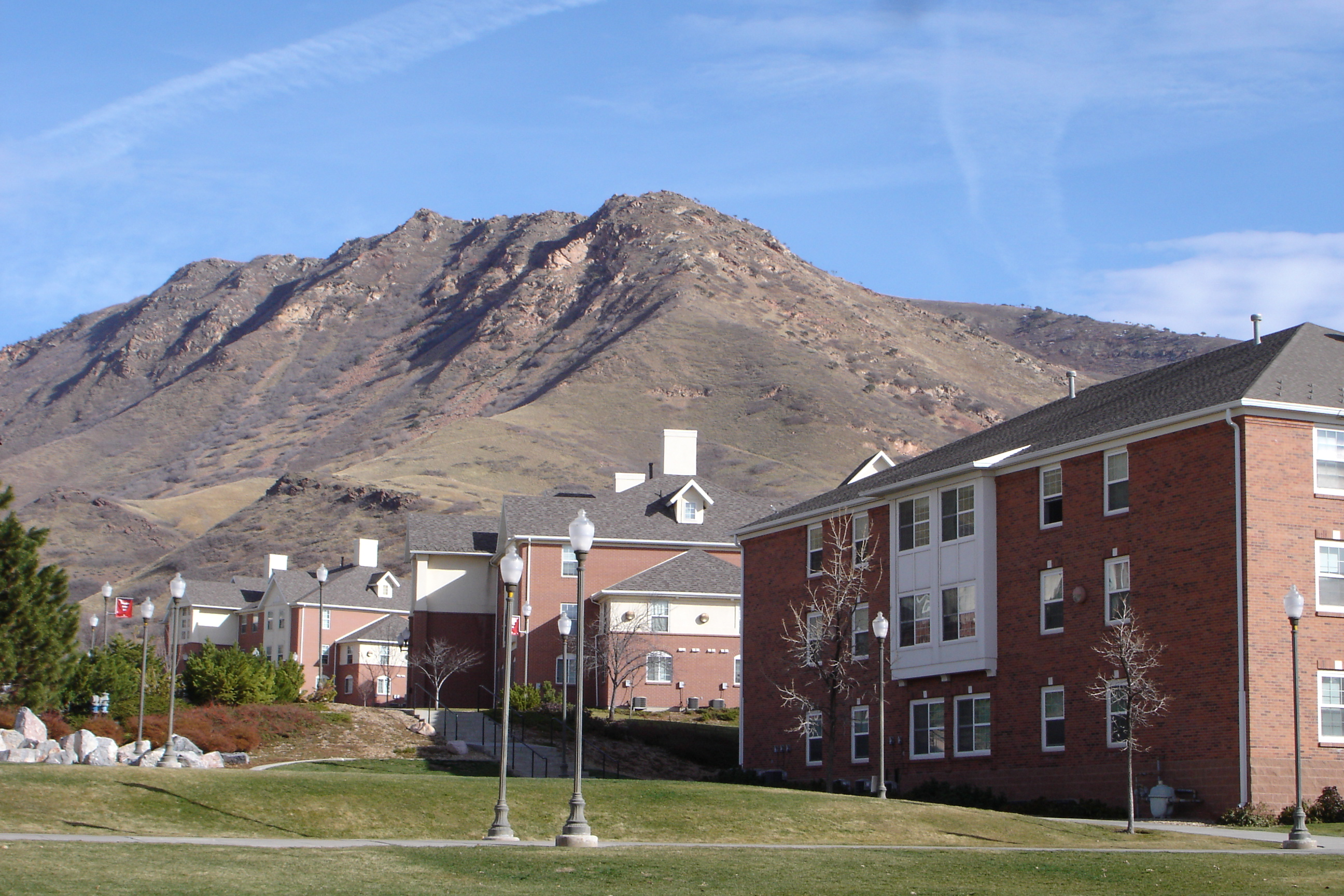
Part of the Olympic Village, currently used by the University of Utah as student housing.

The 2002 Olympic Village was located 4 miles (6 km) east of downtown Salt Lake City, at Historic Fort Douglas, on the campus of the University of Utah. Fort Douglas, a United States Army base, had been established in 1862, but was closed in 1991; from the earliest stages of Olympic planning, the fort was a possible location for the Olympic Village. Following the fort's closure, the University of Utah acquired much of its property and began planning to restore the historic buildings and build new dorms and apartment buildings for its students on the property. The SLOC agreed to pay $28 million of the projected $80 million construction cost if the buildings could be used to house up to 4,000 Olympic athletes during the games. Several Army reserve units that were still located at the fort had to be moved to nearby military installations, such as the Ogden Defense Depot and Camp Williams before work on the village could progress. However, in October 1997, President Bill Clinton vetoed a $12.7 million appropriation bill that would have allowed the remaining military units to move, and temporarily killed the plans for the Olympic Village. On October 24, 1997, the Senate Appropriations Committee overturned the president's veto, and both houses of congress later voted in favor the committee's decision, effectively voiding the president's veto. Prior to the start of construction, a $500,000 archaeological survey of the sites was completed.

Plans were completed and work on the Olympic Village began in summer 1998. The project was to include the restoration of many historic buildings and the construction of 21 low-rise apartment buildings. The first phase of construction, a six-building complex for graduate student housing, was completed September 7, 1999, while future phases were almost completed when the future village open for media tours on January 26, 2001. As part of the plan, the Legacy Bridge was built, spanning Wasatch Boulevard.

During the 2002 games, the Olympic Village housed the athletes, coaches and other officials, many of the historic buildings in the fort housed services for the athletes including 24-hour dining facilities, a fitness center, an internet center, a bank, dry cleaning, mail services, a photo shop, salon, nightclub, and interfaith chapel. The village was divided into two parts: the International Zone and Residential Zone. The International Zone was where media and guests could visit the village, and where many of the athlete services were located. The Residential Zone was for athletes and invited guests only, and included the chapel and nightclub. The Olympic Family Hotel was also located inside the village during the games. During the 2002 Winter Paralympics, the Olympic Village also served the paralympic athletes. Prior to the Olympics the parts of the village that had been completed were used as student housing, their post-Olympic use also.

=== Park City Main Street ===
During the 2002 games, much of Park City's Main Street was turned in a pedestrians exclusive path. The Main Street Celebrations area included three large video screens with Olympic coverage, an NBC broadcast area, performing artists, pin trading, sponsor showcases, food and entertainment. The Main Street Celebrations was open from 11:00 a.m. to 11:00 p.m., free of charge during the Olympics and the Paralympics. The Park City Technical Center was also part of this venue.

=== Rice–Eccles Olympic Stadium ===
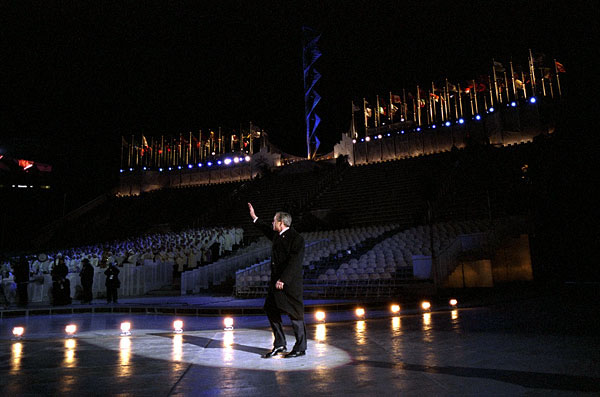
President George W. Bush enters Rice-Eccles Olympic Stadium during the opening ceremony

Rice–Eccles Stadium is an American football stadium located 3 miles (5 km) east of downtown Salt Lake City, on the campus of the University of Utah. It is the home field of the Utah Utes, and sits at an elevation of 4,657 feet (1,419 m) above sea level, and 350 feet (110 m) above downtown Salt Lake City. Rice-Eccles Stadium had its start when the university built Ute Stadium in 1927, and the stadium was expanded and improved. When Salt Lake City was bidding to host the Games between 1993 and 1995, the stadium's capacity was approximately 32,500 people, and the demands for its reconstruction were very high, since the original plan was for the venue to host the opening and closing ceremonies of the Games.For this to happen, the stadium needed to be rebuilt at the end of the 1997 college football season, and virtually its entire structure was demolished. Expansion work was completed in fall 1998, and the stadium opened for the first game of the season on September 12, 1998, with seating for 45,017 spectators.The stadium served as the Olympic Stadium hosting the Olympics opening and closing ceremonies along the Paralympics opening ceremonies. In order to host the ceremonies, the grass was temporarily removed with asphalt exposed, taking its place, and an ice stage was constructed, the main scoreboards were removed.Olympic and Paralympic livery were installed, temporary seating was brought in (allowing more than 50,000 spectators), and the 2002 Olympic and Paralympic Cauldron was installed atop the southern bleachers. An estimated 3.5 billion people watched the opening and closing ceremonies on television through broadcasts from the stadium..

=== Salt Lake Olympic Square ===
The Salt Lake Olympic Square was located in downtown Salt Lake City, and was a four-block area open only to pedestrians during the 2002 games. The Olympic Square was home the Olympic Medals Plaza and the Salt Lake Ice Center, and also included the 22,000 sq ft (2,000 m^{2}) Olympic Superstore, which sold officially licensed products. The square also housed the Sponsor Showcases and featured live music, food, drinks and other activities, including the Olympic Celebration Series concerts. The square, open from 11:00 a.m. to 12:00 a.m., was open to the public free of charge.
