= Hoberman Arch =

Structural sculpture built for the 2002 Winter Olympics in Salt Lake City, Utah

Coordinates: 40°46′27″N 111°59′13″W

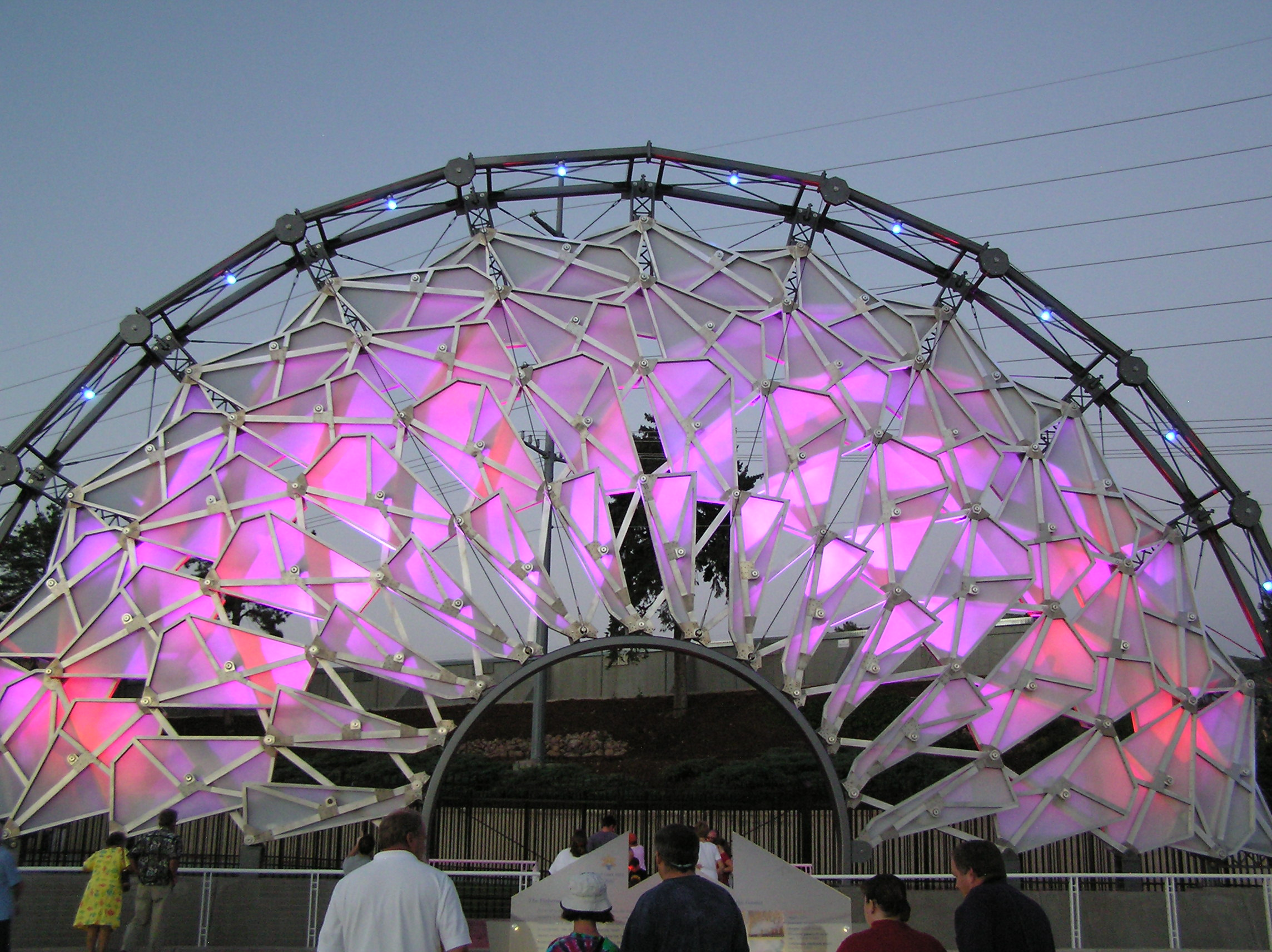
The Hoberman Arch, lit for the evening, at its former location at the University of Utah (in 2003)

The Hoberman Arch is an architectural element designed by Chuck Hoberman as the centerpiece of the Olympic Medals Plaza in Salt Lake City, during the 2002 Winter Olympics. Following the Olympics, the arch was moved to the Salt Lake 2002 Olympic Cauldron Park at the University of Utah where, along with the Olympic cauldron, it was one of the main features and an important part of Salt Lake's Olympic legacy. In August 2014, the arch was removed from the park and placed in storage, where 29 pieces were stolen. A restored arch was placed on display alongside the exit road of the Salt Lake City International Airport in August 2023.

== Design and history ==
The arch is a semi-circular aluminum structure, which opened like the iris of a human eye. It was designed to be used as a mechanical curtain for the Olympic Medal Plaza's stage. The design was inspired by Utah's natural stone arches, such as Delicate Arch. At the time of its construction, the arch was the largest unfolding structure in the world.

It took Hoberman four months to design the arch (with support from Buro Happold). Specialized knuckle assemblies, which allowed the arch to expand and contract, were fabricated by Hudson Machine Works in Brewster, NY. These were paired with the arch's structural components and pieced together in its entirety by Scenic Technologies of New Windsor, New York, who spent an additional four months in constructing the arch in their warehouse in New York. It was then disassembled and then trucked to Utah, being reassembled in January 2002, and unveiled to the public and media by the Salt Lake Organizing Committee (SLOC), on January 25, 2002.

When installed at the medal plaza, it would open to reveal a large 3D sculpture of the 2002 Olympic logo and a second Olympic cauldron, known as the Hero's Cauldron. The stage hosted award ceremonies, where the athletes received their medals, and was used as a concert venue during the Olympics, hosting many performing artists including Creed, Brooks & Dunn and the Dave Matthews Band.

=== After the games ===
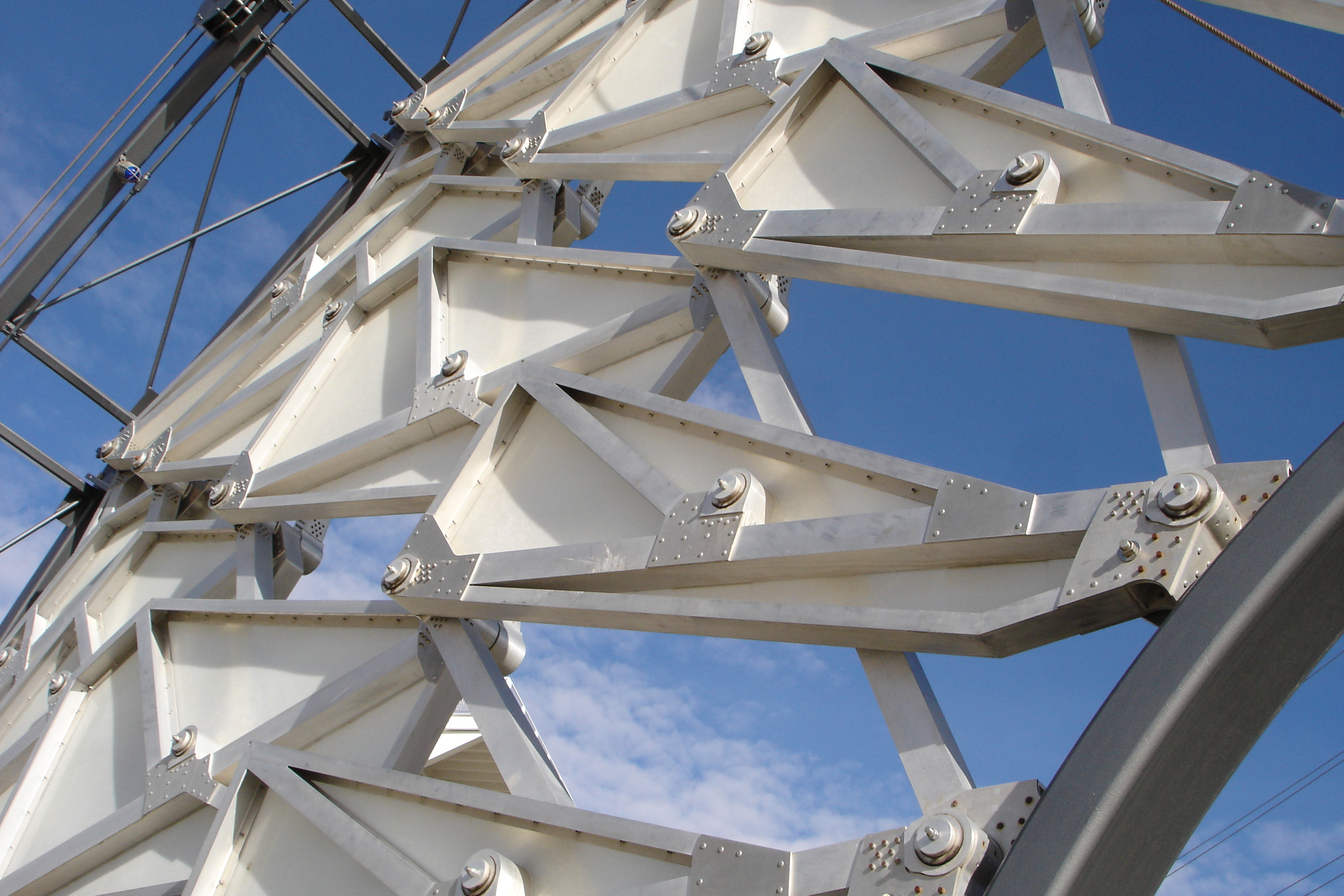
Detail of the Hoberman Arch (in 2012)

Following the Olympics, plans to install the arch at a park setting were developed. Some people wanted the arch to be used in an amphitheater or some kind of concert venue, possibly at downtown's Gallivan Center or Pioneer Park. But because the arch was a symbol of the 2002 games, the United States Olympic Committee put restrictions on possible future locations for the arch. Because of these restrictions, and a lack of consensus on other options, SLOC announced plans, on December 5, 2002, to install the arch at the Salt Lake 2002 Olympic Cauldron Park.

On July 30, 2003, the arch was lifted onto its new base at the park using 3 cranes. The arch was located just outside the park's southern fence and was partly open which allowed visitors to walk through it, while at night the arch was lit with multicolored lights. The arch was removed from the park in August 2014. On December 6, 2014, 29 pieces of the arch were stolen from an impound lot where it had been stored. after which the remaining pieces were moved to an undisclosed location.

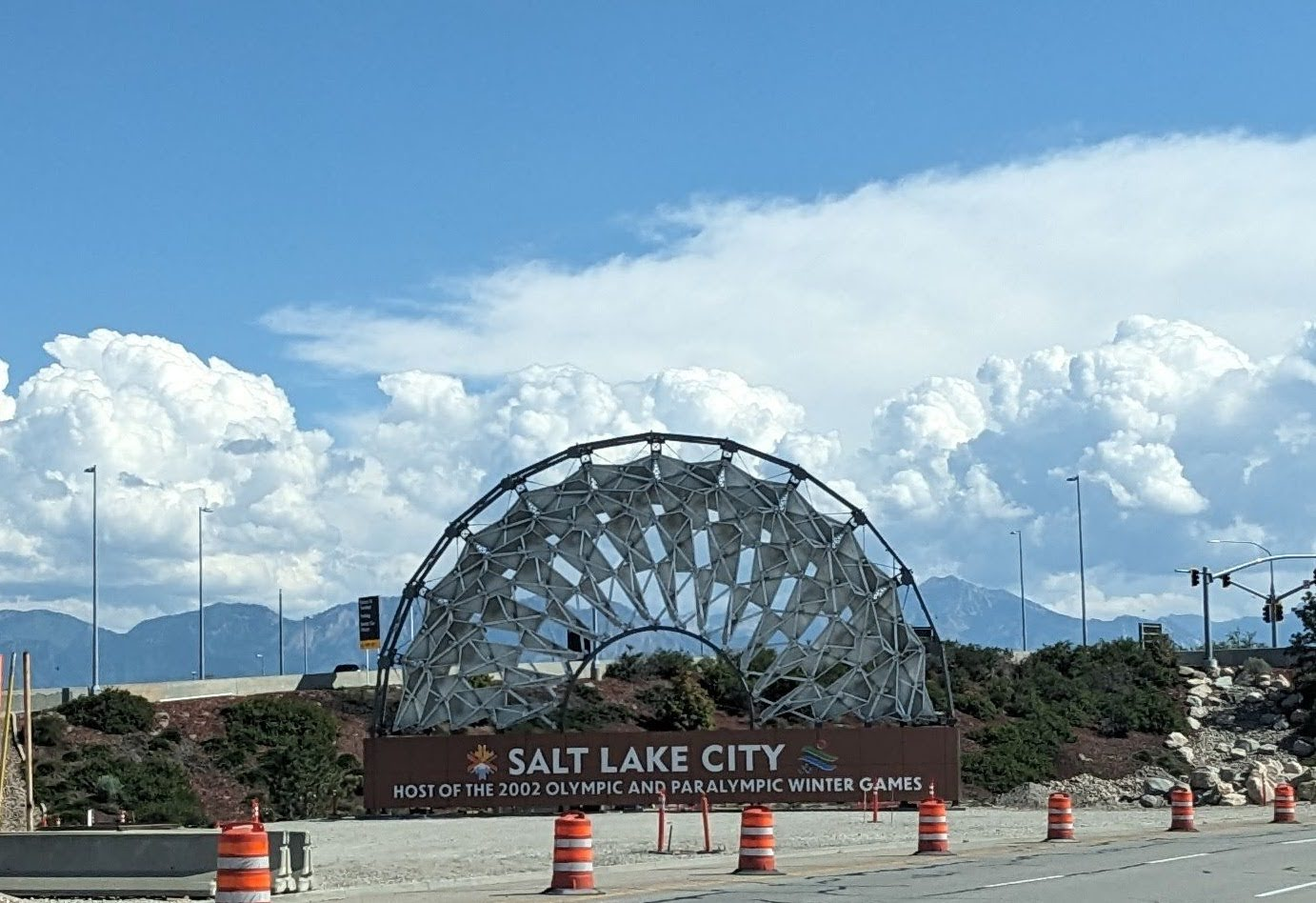
The Hoberman Arch shortly after its installation at the Salt Lake City International Airport, September 2023

On August 29, 2023, the restored arch was unveiled alongside the exit road of the Salt Lake City International Airport. The arch sits atop a new 10–12 foot high base, which includes the 2002 Olympic and Paralympic logos and wording memorializing Salt Lake City as the 2002 host of the games. The reconstruction cost $3.79 million and was completed under the direction of artist Gordon Huether. The installation does not allow the arch to open and close, but does provide lighting at night. The restoration required newly fabricated pieces to replace those that had been previously stolen.

After Salt Lake City was awarded the 2034 Winter Olympics, the wording on the base was immediately updated to "2002 & 2034 Olympic and Paralympic Winter Games Host."

== Structure and mechanism ==
The arch is 36 feet (11 m) tall, 72 feet (22 m) feet wide, and weighs 31,000 pounds (14,000 kg) It is made up of 4,000 individual pieces put together as 96 connected panels and are connected with 13,000 steel rivets. The 96 panels vary in size, but the largest are 9 feet (2.7 m) tall and 5 feet (1.5 m) wide. The panels are also translucent which allowed light from behind to be seen and echoed the 2002 Olympic theme Light the Fire Within. Two 30-horsepower motors controlled eight separate cables which pulled the mechanical curtain open in about 20 seconds. When the arch was fully opened it had folded up into a 6 feet (1.8 m) ring, which framed the stage. It was designed to open and close like the iris of an eye. During the Olympics, it was included in the every evening medal ceremony and when opened, revealed the second Olympic cauldron.

Because of the potential of strong storms during the games, the arch was built to operate in extreme weather, including up to 70-mile (110 km) -per-hour winds.
