= Challenger flag =

Possession of Boy Scout Troop 514

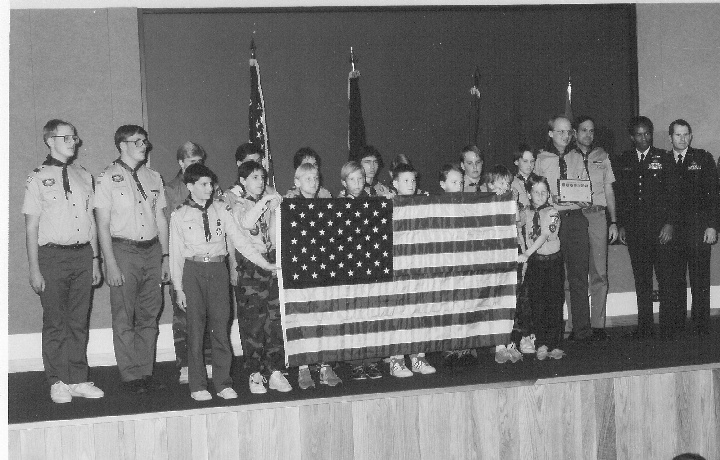
December 18, 1986, the Challenger flag is returned to Troop 514 by astronaut Guion Bluford (second from right) in a formal ceremony at Falcon Air Force Base, Colorado.

The Challenger flag is an American flag that was placed in the flight kit of Space Shuttle Challenger for mission STS-51-L. The flag was sponsored by Boy Scout Troop 514 of Monument, Colorado, whose Scoutmaster was William "Bill" Tolbert, a major in the United States Air Force assigned to the Space Command.

Challenger, which launched with the flag aboard on January 28, 1986, broke apart 73 seconds into its flight. In the course of recovery operations at sea over the next several weeks, the flag was found intact and ultimately returned to the scout troop months later.

In August 2024, the troop transferred the flag to June Scobee Rodgers and the Challenger Learning Center in Colorado Springs. The flag was placed on public display at the center in October 2025.

== Background ==
William "Bill" Tolbert had ordered a "Capitol flag" through Troop 514's congressional representative as a part of the United States Capitol Flag Program. The flag was manufactured by the Valley Forge Flag Company and had been flown briefly over the United States Capitol building in Washington, D.C., on January 25, 1985. Tolbert intended that this Capitol flag eventually be flown aboard a space shuttle and returned to the scout troop, to serve as a source of inspiration. Through calling in multiple favors, the flag was eventually submitted to the NASA Johnson Space Center by the 2d Space Wing, for flight on a space shuttle. On January 28, 1986, it was carried in the "official flight kit" of Space Shuttle Challenger on its last flight. It was sealed in plastic and was next to some souvenir medallions being flown by one of the astronauts. After the destruction of Challenger, when the wreckage was brought up from the bottom of the Atlantic Ocean, rescuers found the flag, still in its sealed plastic bag, intact and completely unscathed. The souvenir medallions had melted into a single lump.

On December 18, 1986, the Challenger flag was returned to Boy Scout Troop 514 in a special ceremony attended by 100 dignitaries, guests, and members of the media, at the Consolidated Space Operations Center, Falcon Air Force Station, Colorado. Astronaut Guion Bluford, who had flown on board the Challenger on two previous missions, and who is also an Eagle Scout, returned the flag to the troop.

== Later usage ==
Following the flag's return, Troop 514 continued to display the Challenger flag for certain special public events and Eagle Courts of Honor.

Early in 1987, Chief Justice Warren E. Burger designated the Challenger flag as the official flag of the ceremonies commemorating the United States Constitution bicentennial and he invited the troop to participate in the bicentennial gala in Philadelphia. On September 17, 1987, the flag was part of a parade through the streets of Philadelphia, and that evening it was presented on the stage of the Philadelphia Civic Center Hall as part of the opening ceremonies. The celebration was attended by an audience of 13,000 people, and televised as We the People 200: The Constitutional Gala. The next day, Boy Scout Troop 514 went to Washington, D.C., where the Challenger flag was flown once again over the United States Capitol.

In 2002, the Challenger flag was loaned to Salt Lake Organizing Committee for the Olympic and Paralympic Winter Games of 2002 to be displayed in Salt Lake City during the 2002 Winter Olympic games. It was also raised at the Games opening and closing ceremonies. During the Games, the flag was displayed at the Joseph Smith Memorial Building.

In 2011, the flag was flown at an Eagle Scout Court of Honor.

On November 3, 2012, the flag was brought onstage for a Mitt Romney rally in Denver by Scoutmaster Bill Tolbert.

On the 25th anniversary of the Challenger disaster, the Challenger flag was flown at the reveille formation of the United States Air Force Academy. The flag's flying was arranged by Troop 514's current Scoutmaster and Cadet Group One Air Officer Commanding, Lt. Col. Michael Hastriter.

In January 2016, the 30th anniversary of the Challenger disaster, the Challenger flag was displayed at a special memorial dinner organized by Challenger Learning Center of Colorado. Retired Shuttle Astronaut Susan Helms was the keynote speaker.

On September 26, 2019, at the dedication of the new Challenger Learning Center of Colorado, the Challenger flag was displayed in front of active and retired US Air Force and NASA dignitaries. Dr. June Scobee Rodgers, widow of Challenger Shuttle commander Dick Scobee, presented the keynote address. Ms. Laura Husband, daughter of the late Columbia Shuttle commander Rick Husband, sang the national anthem at the dedication.
