= 2002 Winter Olympics cauldron =

Receptacle for the Olympic flame

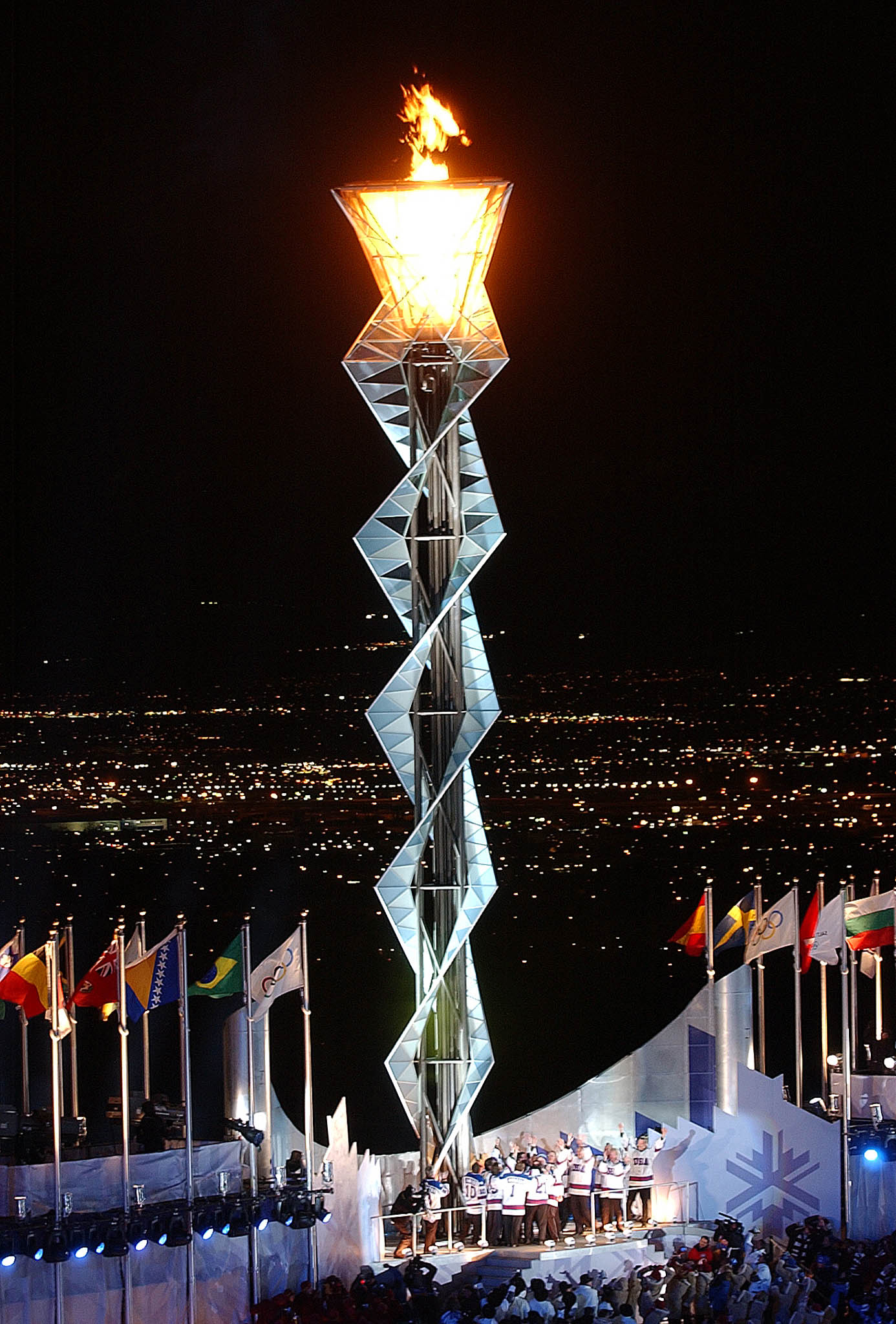
The cauldron in 2002, after it had been lit

2002 Winter Olympics cauldron (Utah)

The 2002 Winter Olympics cauldron held the Olympic flame during the 2002 Winter Olympics held in Salt Lake City, Utah, United States.

== Description and history ==
The Cauldron was designed with the official 2002 Olympic motto Light the Fire Within and the Fire and Ice theme in mind. It was designed to look like an icicle, and was made of glass which allowed the fire to be seen burning within. The actual glass cauldron is 12 feet (3.7 m) high and stands atop a twisting glass and steel support, while the flame within burns at 900 °F (482.2 °C). Together with its support the cauldron stands 72 feet (22 m) tall and was made of 738 individual pieces of glass. Small jets send water down the glass sides of the cauldron, both to keep the glass and metal cooled (so they would not crack or melt), and to give the effect of melting ice. The cauldron was designed by WET Design of Los Angeles, California, its frame built by Arrow Dynamics of Clearfield, Utah, and its glass pieces created by Western Glass of Ogden, Utah. The cauldron's cost was 2 million dollars, and it was unveiled to the public during its original install at Rice-Eccles Stadium on January 8, 2002.

During the Games, the cauldron was installed atop stands at the south-end of the stadium, which allowed it to be seen burning from various points around the Salt Lake Valley. Just prior to the start of the opening ceremony, wind blew out the pilot lights on the cauldron, requiring a failsafe plan to be activated. This plan required that the flame be manually pulled up with a string to ignite the cauldron.

Following the conclusion of the Games, the cauldron moved to the "Salt Lake 2002 Olympic Cauldron Park" just south of the stadium. There it was installed in a reflecting pool, at the center of the park, and was flanked by a V-shaped stone wall. The stones on this wall were engraved with the names of the 2002 medalists, and water cascaded down into the reflecting pool from the top of the wall. The cauldron remained operational and was lit on special occasions, which included the opening weekend of the 2006 Winter Olympics. During the 10-year anniversary of the Olympics, on February 8, 2012, an attempt was made to light the cauldron, but it did light but not on mark and remained lit for only a short period of time. The delayed lighting was blamed on weathered mechanical parts and a lack of maintenance.

To accommodate expansion of Rice-Eccles Stadium, the former cauldron park was removed in 2020. The cauldron itself was taken down on February 14, 2020 and transported to an off-site location where it underwent a refurbishment. The refurbishment included replacing all 738 panes of glass, wiring the structure with LED lights, and replacing the flame mechanisms to improve energy efficiency. The work was overseen by VCBO Architecture. The cauldron was installed atop a new pedestal (with a cascading water feature) at the Olympic and Paralympic Cauldron Plaza on January 29, 2021. This plaza replaced the former park and was officially unveiled on October 29, 2021.
