= 2002 Winter Olympics closing ceremony =

- Part of 2002 Winter Olympics
- Date: 24 February 2002
- Time: 19:00 – 21:25 MST (UTC−07:00)
- Venue: Rice-Eccles Stadium
- Location: Salt Lake City, Utah, United States
- Also known as: An American Musical
- Filmed by: International Sports Broadcasting (ISB)
- Footage: Salt Lake 2002 Closing Ceremony - Full Length on YouTube

The closing ceremony of the 2002 Winter Olympics took place on an abstract shaped ice rink designed by Seven Nielsen at Rice–Eccles Stadium in Salt Lake City, the United States, on 24 February 2002.

== Ceremony ==
=== Opening ===
The ceremony opened with a countdown to one (displayed on the stadium video screens), followed by a brief fireworks display.

=== Parade of Nations ===
The flag bearers of 78 National Olympic Committees entered Rice–Eccles Stadium informally in single file, ordered by the English alphabet. Behind them marched all the athletes, with no grouping by nationality accompanied by music directed by Mark Watters.

=== Anthem ===
The Star-Spangled Banner was sung by boy band, NSYNC* while the American flag (the Challenger flag) was raised by Native American war veterans.

=== Entertainment section ===
This section began with two large dinosaur puppets (voiced by Donny and Marie Osmond) performing a comic bit while perched over the south end of the stadium. This was followed by Dianne Reeves singing "Fascinating Rhythm" accompanied by 4-time World Figure Skating Champion Kurt Browning skating a routine on the ice rink. Next, rock band Kiss performed "Rock and Roll All Nite" aboard a moving platform with pyrotechnic displays and accompanied by several dozen black-clad performers dancing routines on the ice. Figure skating gold medalists Katarina Witt and Kristi Yamaguchi skated routines on the ice during the performance, and joined the band on the platform for the end of the song. Next up was Earth, Wind and Fire performing a medley of their hits "September" and "Shining Star", followed by Gloria Estefan singing a medley of "Get On Your Feet" and "You'll Be Mine (Party Time)". Harry Connick Jr. next sang "Over the Rainbow" alongside a skating performance by Dorothy Hamill. This was followed by a tap routine by dancer Savion Glover, accompanied by a figure skating routine by Russia's 1998 gold medalist Ilia Kulik. A performance by a local a cappella group (Eclipse 6) was followed by another joke from the dinosaur puppets.

The stadium announcer stated that there would be a short break to clean the ice surface-- but all the sweepers left the ice, but only one remained, the janitor. This lone ice sweeper who was later to be revealed to be 1984 Olympic Champion Scott Hamilton performed a figure skating routine to the LeAnn Rimes games official song "Light the Fire Within".

=== Antwerp Ceremony ===
Then came the "Oslo Ceremony" (so called because the original Olympic flag, which was used for transfer of the Winter Games, was first used at the 1952 Winter Olympics in Oslo), which is the transfer of the replica of the Oslo Olympic Flag from the mayor of Salt Lake City, Rocky Anderson, to Jacques Rogge, and then to the mayor of Turin, Sergio Chiamparino. The flag was kept in the Palazzo Cisterna during the next four years. This culminated this part of the program. The Olympic flag was next raised at the next Summer Olympic games in Athens, Greece; opening ceremony that took place on 13 August 2004.

After the flag handover, the Italian-themed section of the ceremony began with a performance of the Domenico Modugno song "Volare" by Irene Grandi, followed by flag aerialists, fashion models, and high-definition projections of Italian iconography on the stadium floor. A new version of the Il Canto degli Italiani was sung by Elisa Toffoli to concluded the handover ceremony.

=== The big secret revealed ===
During the transition to the final speeches, there was a humorous sequence of puppet dinosaurs, who ended up singing "We Are Family". During the song, it was revealed that Donny and Marie Osmond were the operators and voices of the puppets.

=== Ending the Games ===
The newly elected members of the Athletes' Commission of the IOC were then introduced. SLOC President Mitt Romney delivered a speech, thanking everyone. IOC President Jacques Rogge delivered a speech, awarding the Olympic Order in Gold to Romney and declared the Games closed.

Willie Nelson performed "Bridge Over Troubled Water" and the Olympic flag was lowered. A children's choir sang "Happy Trails to You", accompanied by aerialists hanging from lit balloons. A montage of images from the 17-day competition was next projected on large white banners skated back and forth across the ice rink in the middle of the stadium. Singers Charlotte Church and Josh Groban performed "The Prayer" accompanied by ice dancers Renée Roca and Georgi "Gorsha" Sur during the extinguishing of the Olympic flame.

With the stadium now in dark, electronica musician Moby performed "We Are All Made of Stars" to skaters performing with glow-in-the-dark figures and dancers who spread neon paint on the floor of the stadium. Christina Aguilera sang for the first time in public "Infatuation", a track from her upcoming album, after which the athletes were invited to come down to the floor of the stadium. Moby reappeared to perform "In My Heart" as small white inflatable balls were released down both sides of the stadium. Bon Jovi was next on stage to perform "It's My Life", which was followed by simultaneous fireworks displays at sites across the city, ending the show. Bon Jovi appeared for an encore, performing "You Give Love a Bad Name", followed by Moby who ended the festivities with a performance of "Bodyrock".

The Olympic flag would be raised again in the birthplace of the games, Athens, Greece on August 13, 2004 during the opening ceremony of the 2004 Summer Olympics.

== Anthems ==
- National Anthem of the United States performed by NSYNC
- National Anthem of Greece
- National Anthem of Italy
- (International Olympic Committee) Olympic Hymn
