= 2002 Winter Olympic bid scandal =

Allegations of bribery in award to Salt Lake City

The 2002 Olympic Winter Games bid scandal was a scandal involving allegations of bribery used to win the rights to host the 2002 Winter Olympics in Salt Lake City, Utah, United States. Prior to its successful bid in 1995, the city had attempted four times to secure the games, failing each time. In 1998, members of the International Olympic Committee (IOC) were accused of taking gifts from the Salt Lake Organizing Committee (SLOC) during the bidding process. The allegations resulted in the expulsion of several IOC members, and the adoption of new IOC rules. Although nothing strictly illegal had been done, it was felt that the acceptance of the gifts was morally dubious. Soon four independent investigations were underway: by the IOC, the United States Olympic Committee (USOC), the SLOC, and the United States Department of Justice. Both Tom Welch and David Johnson resigned their posts as the head of the SLOC. Many others soon followed. The Department of Justice filed fifteen charges of bribery and fraud. Investigations were also launched into prior bidding process by other cities, finding that members of the IOC received gifts during the bidding process for both the 1998 Winter Olympics and 2000 Summer Olympics.

== Winning bid ==
Ogden-born lawyer Tom Welch and a Utah Economic Development Professional, David Johnson, were in charge of the Salt Lake Bid Committee. From 1986 through 1995, they worked on supporting Salt Lake City's bid in Europe, Latin America, and Africa, meeting with the IOC Members and International Sport organizations.

Despite their efforts, the 1998 Games went to Nagano, Japan, in a 46-to-42 vote. Many felt the reason was that the US had recently been awarded the 1996 Summer Olympics in Atlanta, Georgia. Others, including Welch, believed it was because Nagano had better wined and dined the officials. A Salt Lake Olympic Bid Committee member complained about competing with the Japanese bid committee for the 1998 Olympic Winter Games: "We were giving out saltwater taffy and cowboy hats, and they were giving out computers. IOC members who came to inspect Nagano were put up in ritzy hot spring resorts, where they washed down expensive sushi with sake poured by kimono-clad geisha. They went home laden with souvenir gifts and expensive paintings."

The Nagano Olympic bid committee had spent approximately $14 million on entertaining the 62 IOC Members and many of their companions. The precise figures are not known since Nagano destroyed the financial records after the IOC asked that the entertainment expenditures not be made public. The Melbourne bid committee for the 1996 Summer Olympics discovered the quid pro quo expectations of IOC delegates when they received requests from six African IOC delegates for new cars and sexual favors from local brothels. The requests were denied and the 1996 Summer Olympics went to Atlanta.

More than $16 million was spent on Utah's Olympic bidding. The high costs related to bringing IOC Members to Salt Lake City to see the venues proposed for the Games. This was a priority for the Bid Committee and more than 70 of the 100 Members of the IOC personally visited the city at the Bid Committee's expense. Community Leaders were fully behind the bid. Opportunities were created by Spencer Eccles, Salt Lake Olympic Bid Committee Executive Board Member, for IOC family members to be employed at First Security Corporation Bank. Jim Jardine, Legal Advisor to the Bid Committee, assisted the relatives of IOC Members in gaining admission to the University of Utah, and Intermountain Health Care made medical facilities and treatment available to IOC Members during their visits.

Jon Huntsman, a committee leader, hosted Juan Antonio Samaranch at his lavish Park City home and together with Tom Welch presented President Samaranch with a commemorative Browning Pistol.

In June 1995, 50,000 people gathered outside the Salt Lake City Mayor's office to receive the result of the final announcement.

== Scandal ==
Access to budget documents was routinely denied, Salt Lake City reporters say. In April 1998, the board attempted to safeguard its aura of secrecy by amending its bylaws to stipulate that any member providing the press with confidential information could be dismissed. Frank Joklik was president of the Salt Lake Organizing Committee.

The scandal broke on 24 November 1998, when a report came out showing a letter directed to a child of an IOC member indicating the SLOC was paying the child's tuition. Swiss IOC member Marc Hodler, head of the coordination committee overseeing the organization of the 2002 games, made the accusation that a group of members of the IOC had taken bribes since the start of the bidding process in 1990 for the 1996 Olympic games. Soon, four independent investigations were underway, by the IOC, the USOC, the SLOC, and the United States Department of Justice.

Before any of the investigations could even get under way, both Welch and Johnson resigned their posts as the head of the SLOC. Many others soon followed, including Joklik in January 1999. The Department of Justice filed charges against the two: fifteen charges of bribery and fraud. Johnson and Welch were eventually acquitted of all criminal charges in December 2003.

As part of the investigation, the IOC recommended expelling six IOC members, while continuing the investigation on several others. The six members were Agustin Arroyo of Ecuador, Zein El Abdin Ahmed Abdel Gadir of Sudan, Jean-Claude Ganga of the Republic of Congo, Lamine Keita of Mali, Charles Mukora of Kenya, Sergio Santander Fantini of Chile, and David Sikhulumi Sibandze of Swaziland, though Sibandze resigned during the investigation. Each person was accused of receiving money from the SLOC, either in direct payments, land purchase agreements, tuition assistance, political campaign donations or charitable donations for a local cause.

Ten members of the IOC were expelled and another ten were sanctioned. This was the first expulsion or sanction for corruption in the more than a century the IOC had existed. Although nothing strictly illegal had been done, it was felt that the acceptance of the gifts was morally dubious. Stricter rules were adopted for future bids, and ceilings were put into place as to how much IOC members could accept from bid cities. Additionally, new term and age limits were put into place for IOC membership, and fifteen former Olympic athletes were added to the committee.

In 2006, a report ordered by the Nagano region's governor said the Japanese city provided millions of dollars in an "illegitimate and excessive level of hospitality" to IOC members, including US$4.4 million spent on entertainment alone.

== Aftermath ==
Bain Capital founder and CEO Mitt Romney was brought in during February 1999 to head the SLOC. Romney aided in reorganizing the committee, renewed sponsor enthusiasm, and helped to begin fixing the budget, which at the time was short US$379,000,000 (equivalent to $732,486,017 in 2025). The federal funding accounted for infrastructure improvements only. Romney's successful leadership of the SLOC was seen as helpful to his future political career, in which he would go on to become the Governor of Massachusetts from 2003 to 2007, the 2012 Republican Presidential candidate, and a United States Senator from Utah from 2019 to 2025.

== Bid history ==
Early bid attempts
Game	Event
1932 Winter Olympics	In 1929, only five years after the first games in Chamonix, France, Salt Lake City attempted for the first time to bid for the Winter Olympics. The Utah Ski Club tried to procure the 1932 Games for Salt Lake, but they went to Lake Placid, New York, instead. Due to early Olympic rules (which have since changed), Salt Lake could not bid for the 1936 Games, since the summer games host (Germany) had rights to the winter games.
1972 Winter Olympics	State and city officials got the United States Olympic Committee (USOC) endorsement, but they lost the bid to Sapporo, Japan.
1976 Winter Olympics	The USOC picked Denver, Colorado, over Salt Lake City to represent the United States in bidding. Denver won the bid, but taxpayers voted against providing partial funding for the games, and Denver withdrew as a result. Salt Lake put itself forward as a candidate, but in the fallout, the games were awarded to Innsbruck, Austria, which had recently hosted in 1964.
1992 Winter Olympics	Salt Lake City did not try to bid again until 1985 for the 1992 Games, but the USOC went with Anchorage, Alaska. After Anchorage lost both bids for the 1992 and 1994 Winter Games to Albertville and Lillehammer, respectively, Salt Lake was back in the running for the 2002 Games.
