= United States Capitol Flag Program =

US government program

The United States Capitol Flag Program is a program operated by the Architect of the Capitol which provides American flags flown over the United States Capitol to members of Congress.

The Capitol Flag Program began in 1937 when a member of Congress requested a flag that had flown over the Capitol. Over the years the focus of the program gradually expanded to encompass the commemoration of national holidays and various special events, as well as to honor the work of groups such as schools and civic organizations. Requests for Capitol flags rapidly outgrew the supply; hence, the Architect of the Capitol instituted a program of flying smaller flags that may be purchased through members' offices.

The Architect of the Capitol fulfills all flag requests from members of the United States Senate and the House of Representatives. Flags are flown daily year-round, weather permitting, excluding Thanksgiving Day, Christmas Day and New Year's Day. There are special flag poles where all flags are flown. After it is flown over the Capitol, each flag is issued a keepsake certificate of authenticity by the Architect of the Capitol.

As of 2012, the Architect of the Capitol fulfills on average more than 100,000 flag requests from members of Congress annually, with the number of requests and the popularity of the Capitol Flag Program growing steadily each year.

Each flag gets run up the flagpole for 30 seconds.
