= 2002 Winter Olympics opening ceremony =

- Part of 2002 Winter Olympics
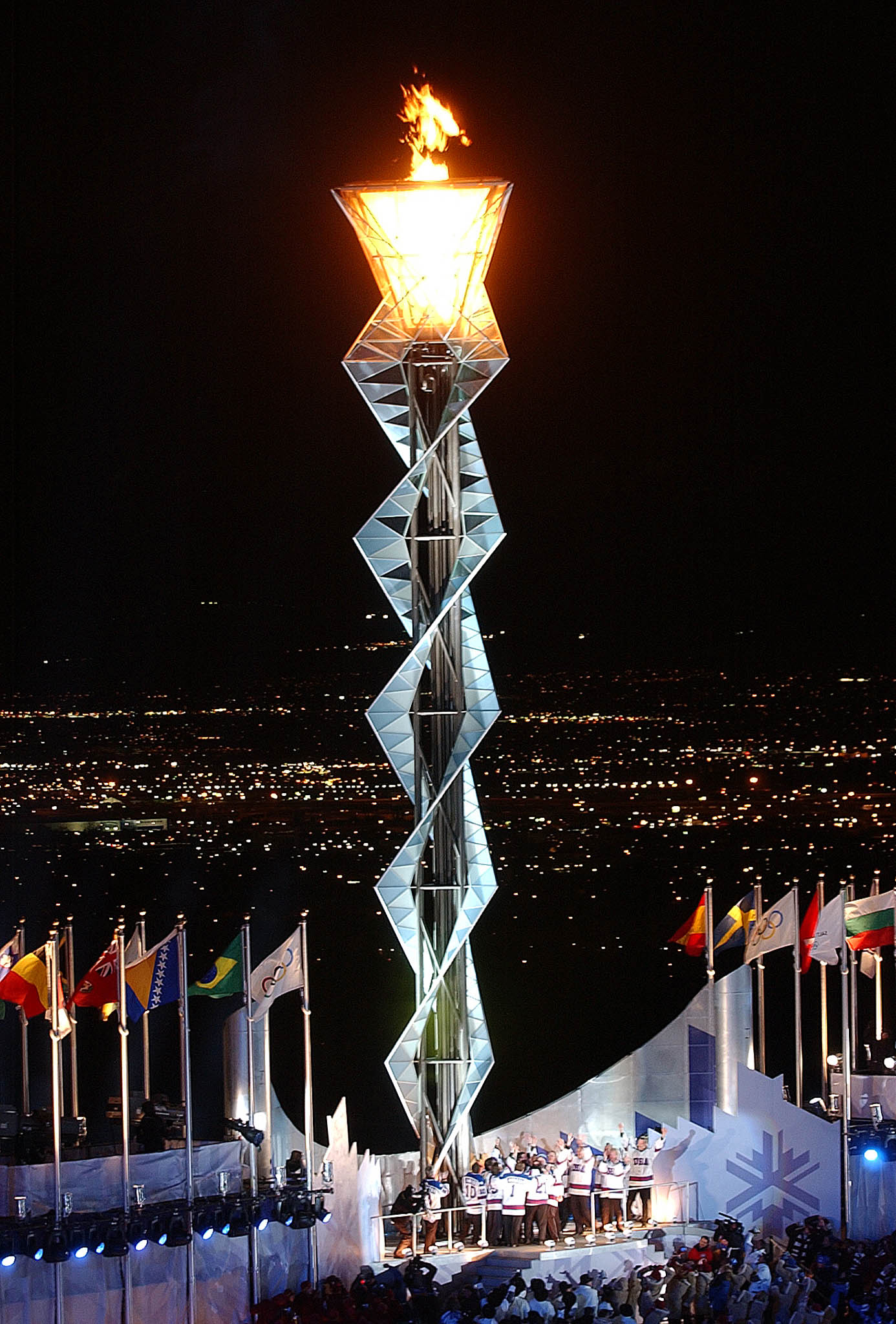
- The Olympic Cauldron
- Date: 8 February 2002
- Time: 19:00 – 21:47 MST (UTC−07:00)
- Venue: Rice-Eccles Stadium
- Location: Salt Lake City, Utah, United States; 40°45′36″N 111°50′56″W
- Also known as: Light the Fire Within
- Filmed by: International Sports Broadcasting (ISB)
- Footage: The ceremony on the IOC YouTube channel on YouTube

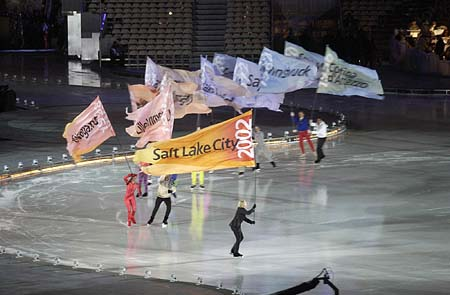
The announcement of past Winter Olympic Games.

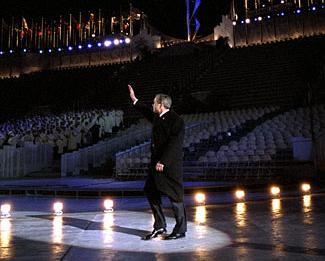
George W. Bush at the opening ceremony

The opening ceremony of the 2002 Winter Olympics took place at the Rice-Eccles Olympic Stadium in Salt Lake City, Utah, United States, on 8 February 2002.

U.S. president George W. Bush opened the Winter Olympics—the first U.S. president to do so—which took place five months after the September 11 attacks, with: "On behalf of a proud, determined and grateful nation...", then the standard opening formula followed. The president was standing among the U.S. athletes, while previous heads of state opened the Games from an official box. NBC's Bob Costas applauded the move during the network's coverage of the opening ceremony.

The opening ceremony was produced and directed by Don Mischer. The production team included Kenny Ortega as the artistic director, Mark Watters as the musical director, and David Goldberg as a producer. The opening ceremony was nominated for an Emmy for Outstanding Variety Music Or Comedy Special.

== Officials and guests ==
The official box was occupied by the President's Olympic delegation, which featured four future members of their respective sport's Hall of Fame:

- Dorothy Koch, the president's sister
- Colin Powell, U.S. Department of State
- Mel Martinez, U.S. Department of Housing and Urban Development
- Gale Ann Norton, U.S. Department of the Interior
- Tommy Thompson, Department of Health and Human Services
- Ann Veneman, U.S. Department of Agriculture
- Christine Todd Whitman, Administrator of the U.S. Environmental Protection Agency
- John Morris, Bass Pro Shops founder
- Hayden Fry, 2003 College Football Hall of Fame (University of Iowa head football coach)
- Cal Ripken Jr., 2007 Baseball Hall of Fame (Baltimore Orioles shortstop, retired in October 2001)
- Darrell Waltrip, 2003 Motorsports Hall of Fame of America and 2012 NASCAR Hall of Fame (1981, 1982, 1985 NASCAR Cup Series Champion)
- Sheryl Swoopes-Jackson, 2016 Basketball Hall of Fame and 2017 Women's Basketball Hall of Fame (WNBA star)
- Lance Armstrong

== Proceedings ==
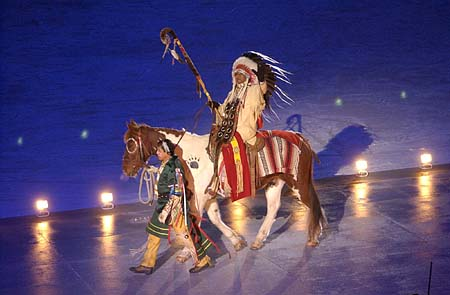
An American Indian Chief during the opening ceremony.

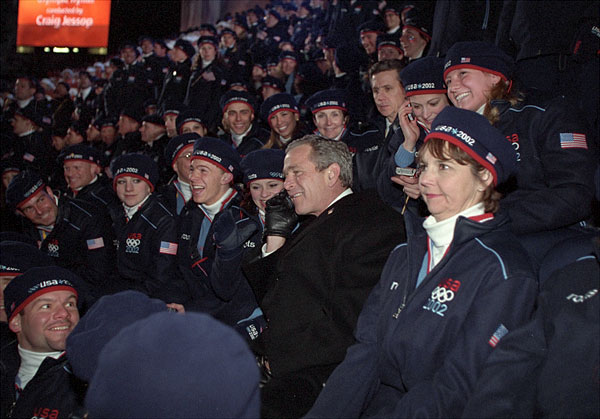
U.S. President George W. Bush takes a phone call from an athlete's family during the opening ceremony.

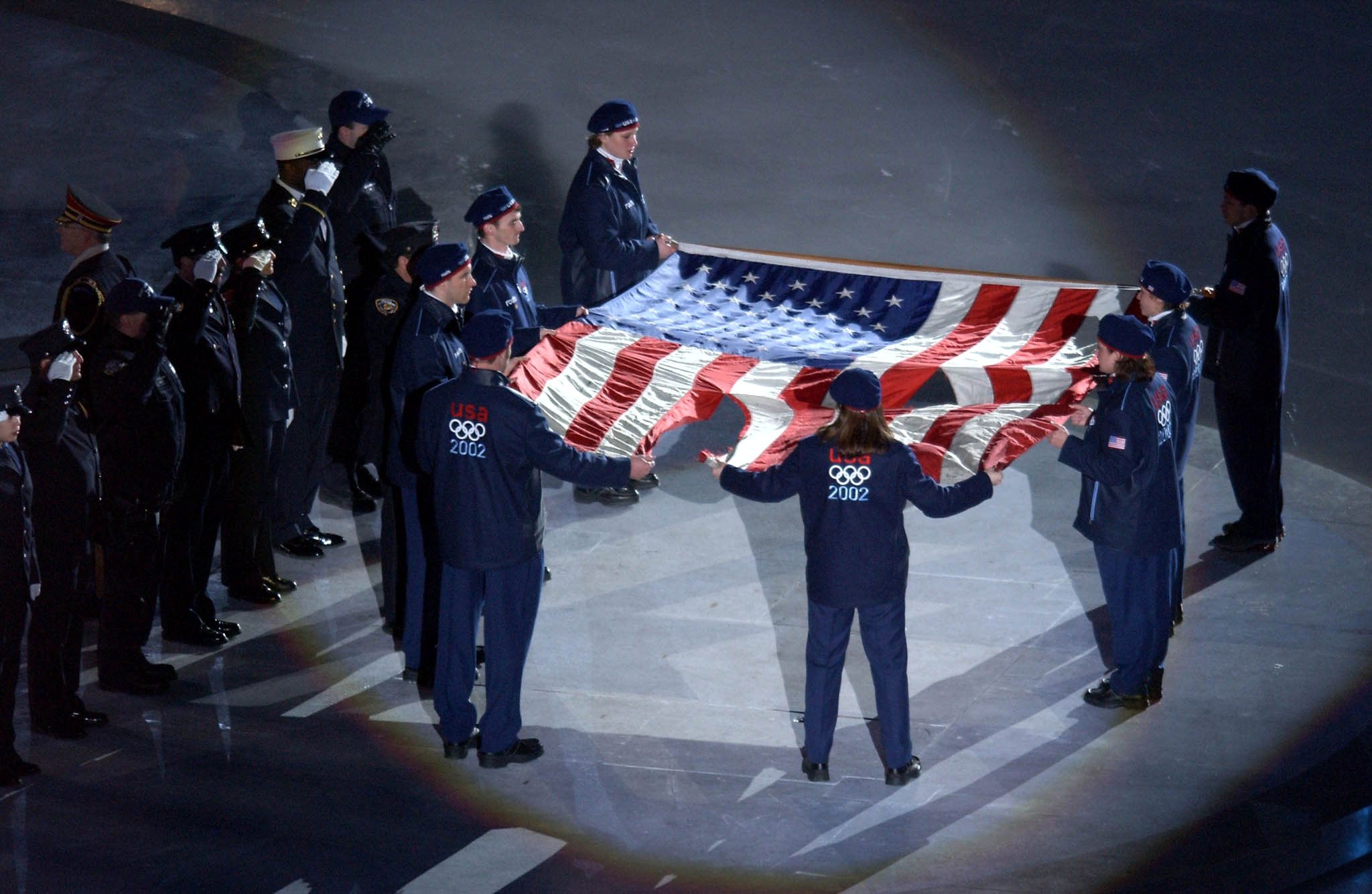
The American flag, held by U.S. Olympians and saluted by members of the NYPD, FDNY, and PAPD.

Prior to the ceremony, the turf inside the stadium was removed and a giant, abstract-shaped ice rink, designed by Seven Nielsen, was installed covering a large part of the stadium floor. Music was directed by Mark Watters. Figure skaters, speed skaters, and hockey players performed on the ice, while cloggers, dancers, and members of the five major local Native American tribes (Ute, Shoshone, Goshute, Paiute, and Navajo) performed authentic ceremonial dances on the surrounding platform.

A torn American flag recovered from the wreckage of the September 11 attacks was carried into the stadium by an honor guard of American athletes and escorted in by firefighters and police officers of the NYPD, FDNY, and Port Authority Police, who then stood at attention and saluted the flag. The Mormon Tabernacle Choir, clad in white sweaters, performed "The Star-Spangled Banner", the US national anthem, as the Challenger flag was raised. The parade of the 2,300 athletes was led by the Child of Light and began traditionally with Greece and ending with the host nation, the United States of America. The entrance into the stadium was introduced with Bugler’s Dream, and a medley of music was performed until the US athletes entered; the US Olympic team entered to John Williams’ Olympic Fanfare and Theme, composed to conclude Bugler’s Dream and paired with it on recordings released by NBC. The parade of athletes concluded with a rendition of The Stars and Stripes Forever. As the artistic section kicked off, the five native Utah Native American tribes arrived together on horseback and performed several traditional "Welcome" stomp dances. Robbie Robertson performed during this segment.

It was reported that the IOC had rejected a proposal by the USOC to have its flagbearer carry the Ground Zero flag during the parade of nations, and a USOC spokesperson stated that another idea for the flag and honor guard to enter after the U.S. team in the parade of nations would violate the official protocol.

The beauty of the Utah landscape was showcased as huge puppets of native Utah animals, including a 15-foot (4.6 m) long bison and the American bald eagle (the national bird and animal of the U.S.), entered the stadium, as well as dancing pioneer settlers as two trains came together on, symbolizing the US railroad industry which was beneficial to Utah's economy beginning in the 1860s, as well as economically linking the Western U.S. and the Eastern U.S. At the end of this segment, the performers unfurled a giant quilt that covered the entire stadium floor with the 2002 Winter Olympics logo in the center. Two figure skaters, Olympians Kristi Yamaguchi, Jozef Sabovcik (the fire within), and Scott Hamilton performed on the oversized ice rink to the song "Gold" by Linda Eder. Other notable skaters included a young local skater and Beatrisa Liang as younger versions of Kristi Yamaguchi's character.

The ceremonies were choreographed and rehearsals led by Sarah Kawahara. Sarah won an Emmy for her work in both the opening and closing ceremonies for the Games. Performers were auditioned and put in over 150 hours of practice on the weekends leading up to the Games. Practices were held at both Steiner Ice Arena and on the official venue ice. The main child of light was played by Ryne Sanborn, a young local hockey player who was in the seventh grade at the time of the ceremonies. Sanborn later went on to co-star in the Salt Lake City-based musical trilogy, High School Musical.

After speeches by Jacques Rogge, President of the IOC and Mitt Romney, the CEO of the Salt Lake Organizing Committee, U.S. President George W. Bush, standing with the U.S. Olympic athletes, formally opened the Games, saying so on "behalf of a proud, determined, and grateful nation", due to the U.S. still recovering from the 9/11 attacks half of a year earlier. The Olympic flame, which had traveled 13,500 miles (21,700 km) was carried into the stadium by figure skaters Dorothy Hamill and Dick Button. They passed it to other pairs U.S. Olympians, who either ran or skated their short relay. Alpine skier Picabo Street and hockey player Cammi Granato carried it up the steps to the towering torch where they were met by Mike Eruzione, captain of the "Miracle on Ice" hockey team that won the Olympic gold medal in 1980. Eruzione summoned the other members of the team, who together lit the Olympic torch. The opening ceremony would win seven Emmy Awards.

Following the lighting of the cauldron, "Light the Fire Within," the 2002 Winter Olympics' theme song, was sung by LeAnn Rimes to conclude the ceremony. A fireworks display properly ended the ceremony, to the finale of Igor Stravinsky's Firebird Suite and Beethoven's Ode to Joy.

The president opened the Games standing among the athletes, while previous heads of state opened the Games from an official box. NBC's Bob Costas applauded the move during the network's coverage of the opening ceremony.

== Music ==
- The opening ceremony included Grammy Award-winning artist LeAnn Rimes singing "Light the Fire Within", the official song of the 2002 Winter Olympics.
- Michael Kamen and Brian May composed a ten-minute orchestral piece, "The Fire Within", with Kamen conducting and May featured on guitar.
- "Gold". Linda Eder's 2002 single from the musical Camille Claudel.
- John Williams composed a five-minute work for orchestra and chorus, "Call of the Champions", that served as the official theme of the 2002 Winter Olympics, his first for a Winter Olympiad. It was performed by the Utah Symphony Orchestra and featured the Mormon Tabernacle Choir and the Madeleine Choir School singing the official motto of the Olympic Games "Citius, Altius, Fortius" (Faster, Higher, Stronger). The premiere of the work at the opening ceremony also coincided with John Williams's 70th birthday. The work is featured on the CD American Journey, and also on the Choir's recording Spirit of America.
- Dimitri Shostakovich's Symphony No. 5 (Shostakovich)
- Igor Stravinsky's The Firebird Suite Finale
- Ludwig van Beethoven's Ode to Joy From Symphony No. 9 (Beethoven)

== Anthems ==
Both anthems were performed by the Mormon Tabernacle Choir:

- – National Anthem of the United States
- (International Olympic Committee) – Olympic Hymn
