= Salt Lake Organizing Committee for the Olympic and Paralympic Winter Games of 2002 =

2002 Olympics local organizing committee

- Headquarters: Salt Lake City
- CEO: Mitt Romney
- Website: Olympic: http://saltlake2002legacy.com/ Paralympic: http://saltlake2002.paralympic.org/

The Salt Lake Organizing Committee for the Olympic and Paralympic Winter Games of 2002 (SLOC) was the organization responsible for the 2002 Winter Olympics and 2002 Winter Paralympics in Salt Lake City, USA. The SLOC secured their bid for the 2002 Olympic Games in 1995. After the SLOC was exposed to be in disarray in the ensuing years, Mitt Romney was hired in 1999 to turn around the failing organization. Under Romney's leadership, the SLOC ended up hosting a successful Olympic games with financial surpluses.

In June 2001, the International Olympic Committee (IOC) and the International Paralympic Committee (IPC) had signed an agreement that would ensure that the staging of the Paralympic Games is automatically included in the bid for the Olympic Games. The agreement came into effect at the 2008 Paralympic Summer Games in Beijing, and the 2010 Paralympic Winter Games in Vancouver. However, the Salt Lake 2002 Organizing Committee, chose to follow the practice of "one bid, one city" already at the 2002 Games in Salt Lake City, and hosted both the Olympics and the Paralympics.

== See also ==
- 2002 Winter Olympic bid scandal
