= Appel (surname) =

Appel is a surname. Meaning "apple" in Dutch and Low German, it can be a metonymic occupational surname for an apple grower or seller. It can also be a German name, based on a pet form of Apprecht. Notable people with the surname include:

- Alfred Appel (1934–2009), American scholarly expert on Vladimir Nabokov and author
- Allen Appel (born 1945), American novelist
- Andrew Appel (born 1960), American computer scientist and author
- Anna Appel (disambiguation)
- Anne Milano Appel, American translator
- Benjamin Appel (1907–1977), American novelist
- Bluma Appel (1919–2007), Canadian philanthropist
- Bram Appel (1921–1997), Dutch footballer
- Brent R. Appel (born 1950), American Justice of the Iowa Supreme Court
- Bruno Appels (born 1988), Belgian football goalkeeper
- Carmela Appel (born 1996), Dutch cricketer
- Chris Appel, American basketball player
- Colette Appel (born 1986), American pair skater
- David Appel (born 1950), Israeli businessman
- David Appel (born 1981), Czech ice hockey player
- Elly Appel-Vessies (1952–2022), Dutch tennis player
- Eric Appel (born 1980), American television/film writer, director, and producer
- Ernesto Ruffo Appel (born 1952), Mexican politician
- Frank Appel (born 1961), German CEO of Deutsche Post
- Fredrik Appel (1884–1962), Danish architect
- Gaby Appel (born 1958), German field hockey player
- Gerald B. Appel (born 1947), American nephrologist
- Hans Appel (1911–1973), German footballer
- Izaak Appel (1905–1941), Polish chess master
- Jacob Appel (1680–1751), Dutch painter
- Jacob M. Appel (born 1973), American bioethicist
- Jan Appel (1890–1985), German revolutionary
- Jayne Appel (born 1988), American professional basketball player
- Jesper Appel (born 1993), Swedish professional ice hockey player
- Johann von Appel (1826–1906), Austrian governor of Bosnia and Herzegovina
- John Appel (1859–1929), Australian politician
- John Appel (born 1958), Dutch documentary filmmaker
- Karel Appel (1921–2006), Dutch painter
- Kenneth Appel (1932–2013), American mathematician
- Kevin Appel (born 1967), American painter and university professor
- Lawrence Appel, American nutrition researcher
- Libby Appel (born 1937), American artistic director
- Marianne Appel (1913–1988), American artist and puppet designer
- Mark Appel (born 1991), American professional baseball player
- Marty Appel (born 1948), American public relations and sports management executive
- Mike Appel (born 1942), American record producer/manager
- Otto Appel (1867–1952), German botanist and agriculturalist
- Patrick Appel (born 1989), German politician
- Peter H. Appel (born 1964), American management consultant and government official
- Reinhard Appel (1927–2011), German journalist and television presenter
- Richard Appel (born 1963), American television writer and producer
- Rolf Appel (1921–2012), German inorganic chemist
- Ron Appel (born 1959), Swiss bioinformatician
- Sam Appel (1871–1947), American actor
- Scott Appel (1954–2003), American musician and musicologist
- Staci Appel (born 1966), American politician
- Stanley Appel (1933–2023), British television producer and director
- Paul Émile Appell (also known as Paul Émile Appel) (1855–1930), French mathematician
- Valdir Appel (born 1946), Brazilian former footballer and sports writer

== See also ==
- Apfel
