= Awa Marie Coll-Seck =

Senegalese infectious diseases specialist and politician (born 1951)

Dr Awa Marie Coll-Seck
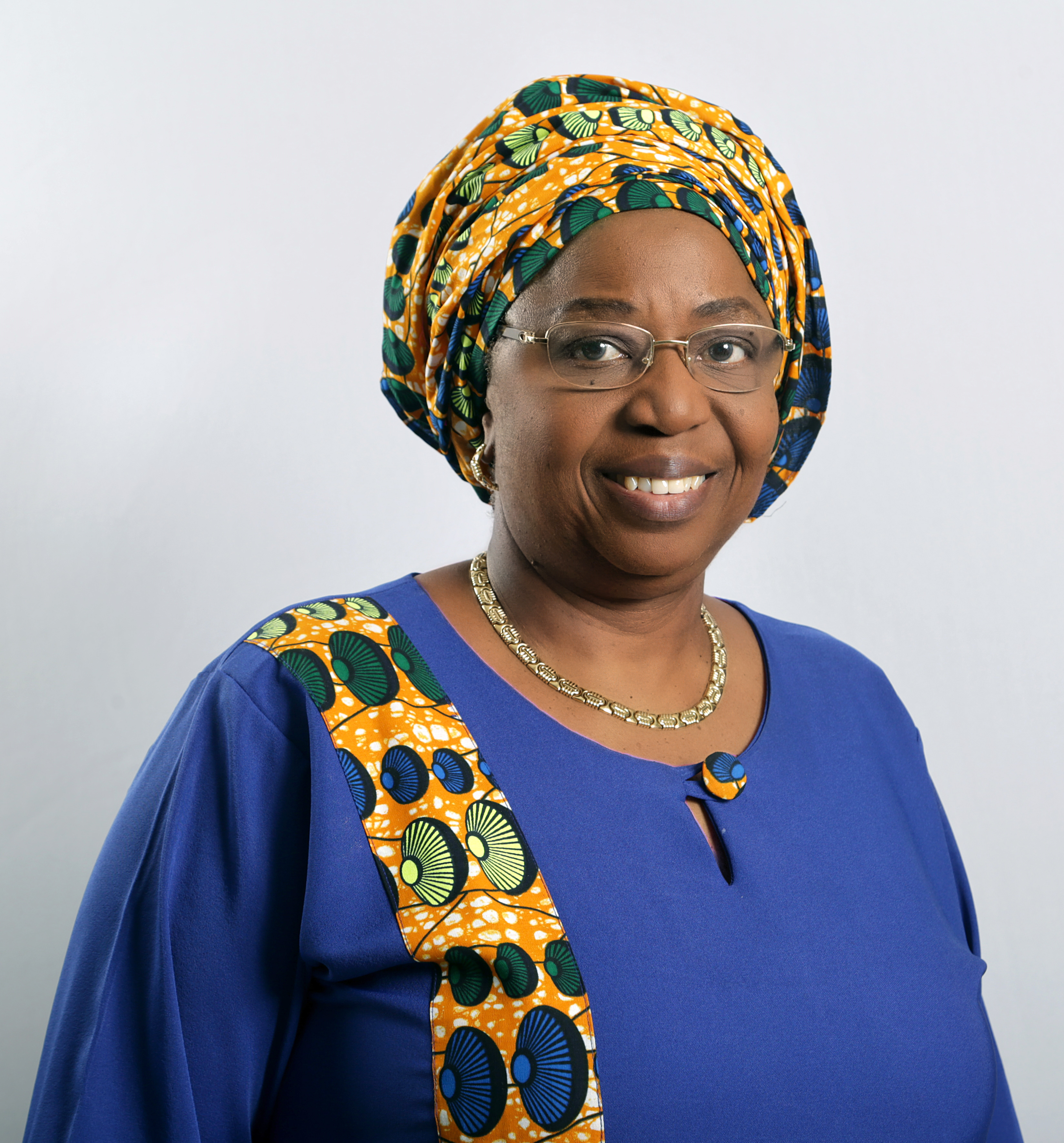
- Awa Marie Coll-Seck in 2019

Minister of Health and Social Affairs

Personal details
- Born: 1951 (age 74–75) Dakar, Senegal
- Education: Cheikh Anta Diop University

Awa Marie Coll-Seck (born 1951 in Dakar, Senegal) is a Senegalese infectious diseases specialist and politician who served as Minister of Health of Senegal from 2001 to 2003 and again from 2012 to 2017. She also served as former Executive Director of the Roll Back Malaria Partnership and is on the board of directors of several notable global health organizations. She is an agenda contributor of the World Economic Forum.

== Education and publications ==
After earning a degree in medicine in 1978 from the University of Dakar, Coll-Seck served for nearly twenty years as a specialist in infectious diseases in leading hospitals in Dakar, Senegal and Lyon, France. In 1989, she was appointed Professor of Medicine and Infectious Diseases at the University of Dakar and Chief of Service for Infectious Diseases at the University Hospital in Dakar.

Coll-Seck is the author of over 150 scientific publications and communications on diverse subjects (including malaria, measles, meningitis, tetanus, typhoid fever, tuberculosis, HIV/AIDS and cardiovascular diseases), and is a member of over 20 professional societies and organizations.

== Career ==
From 1996 to 2001, Coll-Seck served as a Director at the Joint United Nations Programme for HIV/AIDS (UNAIDS) at its headquarters in Geneva, Switzerland. She led the Department of Policy, Strategy and Research, the largest department within UNAIDS consisting of a diverse group of physicians, nurses, researchers, and other international policy and technical experts "best practice" guidance to assist governments and civil society in mounting their national and community responses to the global AIDS epidemic. Awa Marie Coll-Seck was subsequently named Director of the UNAIDS Department of Country and Regional Support, where she coordinated and mobilized the UN system response to the epidemic while supervising UNAIDS staff serving at four regional offices and at country-level offices throughout Africa, Asia, Eastern and Central Europe, and Latin America and the Caribbean. She also served as a Commissioner in United Nations Secretary General Kofi Annan's Commission on HIV/AIDS and Governance in Africa.

From 2001-2003, Coll Seck served as the Minister of Health and Prevention of the Republic of Senegal. From 2004 to 2011, she was Executive Director of the Roll Back Malaria Partnership. She was elected as chairperson of Committee B of the World Health Assembly and also as president of the Assembly of the Ministries of Health of the West African Health Organization in 2002. She was the Chair of the Medicines for Malaria Venture's Access and Delivery Advisory Committee (ADAC) from 2007 to 2010. She went on to be a proactive member of MMV's Board of Directors from 2011 to 2012. She participated as a speaker at a 2012 Falling Walls event.

She then returned as the Minister of Health and Social Action from 2012 to 2017 in the Republic of Senegal. She was appointed as the Minister of State in 2017, serving until 2019.

In January 2014, Coll-Seck co-authored an article alongside fellow GAVI board member Dagfinn Høybråten titled “How businesses can boost global health.” In the article, the pair called on the business leaders at Davos to turn their focus to global health, arguing that vaccines provide a tremendous return on investment. Later in the year, she founded the Afrivac Foundation, described as the “Public-Private Partnership for Immunization in Africa”. She was also a speaker at the Women Deliver 4th Global Conference.

In January 2016, Coll-Seck was appointed by United Nations Secretary-General Ban Ki-moon to the High-level Advisory Group for Every Woman Every Child. From 2016 until 2018, she served on the Guttmacher-Lancet Commission on Sexual and Reproductive Health and Rights (SRHR), as well as the board of African Constituency Bureau of The Global Fund to Fight AIDS, Tuberculosis and Malaria. On January 19, 2017, Coll-Seck participated in an event called “The Next Frontier in Global Financing: High-Impact Solutions for Women and Children” in Davos, Switzerland. The event also featured Bill Gates as a speaker, and was sponsored by the Global Financing Facility, World Bank Group and Merck.

On January 24, 2018, Coll-Seck was announced as a new member of the board of directors for the Coalition for Epidemic Preparedness Innovations (CEPI).

Coll-Seck was appointed the Chair of the National Committee of the Extractive Industries Transparency Initiative on April 8, 2019. She was a speaker at the 2021 Africa Health Agenda International Conference. Her presentation was hosted by the International Federation of Pharmaceutical Manufacturers & Associations (IFPMA), and was co-sponsored by the International Chamber of Commerce (ICC), Global Innovation Policy Center (GIPC), and the Innovation Council.

In 2020, she co-chaired (alongside Helen Clark) “A future for the world's children?”, a WHO-UNICEF-Lancet Commission. In January 2021, the Government of Canada announced the appointment of Coll-Seck to the Board of Directors of Grand Challenges Canada. In August 2021, as a part of the International Year of Basic Sciences for Sustainable Development, she called on Africa's governments to increase funding for scientific research in the continent so as to reduce scientific dependency on the West. On October 26, 2021, she participated in an event titled “Investing in Women's Health – the Key to Africa's Recovery” hosted by the Global Perspectives Initiative (GPI) and the Global Financing Facility.

== Other activities ==
- Virchow Prize for Global Health, Member of the Prize Committee (since 2022)
- Exemplars in Global Health, Member of the Senior Advisory Board (since 2020)
- Africa Research Excellence Fund (AREF), Member of the Advisory Panel (since 2015)
- Cheick Zaïd University, member of the Scientific Council
- Clinton Health Access Initiative, member of the board of directors
- Every Woman Every Child, member of the High Level Steering Group
- Family Planning 2020, member of the Reference Group
- Galien Forum Africa, chair of the Scientific Committee
- Gavi, Member of the Board (2012-2015, 2021–present)
- Global Financing Facility, member of the Investor Group
- The Global Fund to Fight AIDS, Tuberculosis and Malaria, member of the Board
- Harvard Ministerial Leadership Program, member of the Advisory Board
- Innovative Vector Control Consortium, former Executive Director
- Program for Appropriate Technology in Health (PATH), former Executive Director
- RBM Partnership To End Malaria, Member of the Board
- Resolve to Save Lives, member of the Board of Directors
- Speak Up Africa, Champion
- World Health Organization, member of the WHO Advisory Group on the Ebola Virus Disease Response

== Recognition ==
Coll-Seck has been awarded the following professional and academic honours: the Chevalier de l’Ordre du Mérite de la République Francaise, Chevalier des Palmes Académiques Francaises, Officier de l’Ordre du Mérite Sénégalais and Chevalier de l’Ordre du Mérite du Burkina Faso. She was elected as chairperson of Commission B of the 2002 World Health Assembly and as President of the Assembly of the Ministries of Health of the West African Health Organization (WAHO, 2002–2003) and is currently a member of the Academy of Sciences and Technologies of Senegal.
