= Reproductive Health Supplies Coalition =

- Abbreviation: RHSC
- Founded: 2004; 22 years ago
- Type: Non-Governmental Organization
- Purpose: Reproductive health supplies, reproductive health, maternal health, family planning, global health
- Location: International locations
- Key people: Beth Fredrick, Chair; Martyn Smith, Director
- Website: www.rhsupplies.org

The Reproductive Health Supplies Coalition (RHSC) is a global partnership of public, private and non-governmental organizations. Its aim is to ensure that all people in low- and middle-income countries can choose, obtain and use the supplies and appropriate services they need to safeguard their reproductive health. Since 2004, the Coalition has been part of international efforts to secure reproductive health supplies by increasing resources, strengthening systems, and building effective partnerships.

== History ==
Since the 1970s, the international community has worked on providing access to the supplies and equipment needed to deliver quality reproductive health services in the developing world. In the early years, that engagement was largely financial and technical, focused in particular on effective supply chain management. By the late 1990s waning interest within the international donor community coupled with weak commitment by countries prompted many to see sustained access to reproductive health supplies as depending as much on effective advocacy as on purely technical support. Alarmed at the prospect of significant funding shortfalls, stakeholders from around the world met in 2001 in Istanbul at a conference entitled "Meeting the Challenge". This conference was the starting point for a coordinated global reproductive health supplies movement. In 2003 the Supply Initiative was established as a coordinating mechanism. In 2004, 12 organizations, mostly donors from the public and non-governmental sectors, established the Reproductive Health Supplies Coalition. Their aim was to foster better coordination and collaboration in such areas as global advocacy, resource mobilization, and supply chain strengthening. By the end of 2011 the Reproductive Health Supplies Coalition included 155 member organizations, among them developing country governments, international and national non-governmental organizations, civil society organizations, technical agencies, bilateral donors, multilateral organizations, private foundations, regional bodies, and manufacturers. In 2011, 360 participants from 56 countries gathered in Addis Ababa, Ethiopia, to mark the 10th anniversary of Meeting the Challenge and raise the international profile of reproductive health commodity security.

== Reproductive health supplies ==
Reproductive health supplies refer to any material or consumable needed to provide reproductive health (RH) services. This includes contraceptives for family planning, drugs to treat sexually transmitted infections, and equipment such as that used for safe delivery.

More specialized definitions of RH supplies have also been formulated. One of these is WHO's Interagency List of Essential Medicines for Reproductive Health (2006), which reflects the current international consensus on essential medicines for the provision of quality RH services. Because the list prioritizes medicines believed to address the most pressing public health problems, it is by definition, selective. Nonetheless, it does include a broad range of contraceptives, drugs to prevent and treat sexually transmitted diseases and HIV/AIDS, and medicines to ensure healthy pregnancy and delivery. The Interagency List is a subset of the WHO Model List of Essential Medicines, updated every two years since 1977. The 17th edition of the Essentials Medicines List (EML) was last published in 2011. To assist countries who formulate their own lists of essential RH supplies, based on local needs, the Coalition partners WHO, UNFPA and PATH published the Essential Medicines for Reproductive Health: Guiding Principles for their inclusion on National Medicines Lists (2006).

== Threats to reproductive health commodity security ==
Worldwide, the availability of reproductive health (RH) supplies, including contraceptives, medicines for prevention and treatment of sexually transmitted diseases and HIV/AIDS, and medicines to ensure healthy pregnancy and delivery, falls short of current demands. No single set of factors can fully explain this reality, but the three factors are of particular significance:

- Limited resources: The demand for reproductive health supplies is greater than ever and with the share of development assistance dropping, ensuring adequate donor resources has become critical to meeting the supply challenge.
- Inadequate systems: With more responsibilities brought by a shift towards greater country ownership of the development process, it is more and more difficult to find a way through an environment that is more and more complex.
- Lack of coordination: Coordination and harmonization of tools at the global level are necessary to combat against resource shortfalls and failing to make the most of existing resources. Global political will and advocacy are critical to give priority to reproductive health.

== Strategic Pillars ==
Achieving The Coalition's vision will not occur without certain conditions being met: that supplies actually reach those who need them most; that the supplies are affordable and within the reach of all; that supplies and products are of trusted quality; and that there is a sufficient choice of supplies to meet users' needs. These four broad preconditions—availability, equity, quality, and choice—are the Strategic Pillars.

- Availability: The ability of women and men to obtain safe, affordable supplies that meet their reproductive health needs. Supply availability exists when products feed into the supply chain and successfully make their way to the point-of-distribution, where users can obtain them.
- Quality: The ability of women and men to have supplies they can trust are both safe and effective. Good sexual and reproductive health depends on ensuring the quality of all reproductive health supplies.
- Equity: The ability of all people to have equitable access to reproductive health supplies. Age, economic well-being, gender, and civil status all have profound implications for the kinds of supplies potential users seek and the ability of users to afford them. The barriers impeding universal access to sexual and reproductive health must be overcome.
- Choice: The ability of all who seek family planning services to have a broad range of options from which to choose. An individual's need for contraception evolves throughout his or her life cycle. Accessing the "right" contraceptive increases the likelihood reproductive health needs will be met; a mismatch, research shows, is more likely to lead to dissatisfaction, lower continuation rates, and often method failure.

== Working Groups and other mechanisms for collaboration ==
Three Working Groups are the principal vehicles through which Coalition members collaborate.
The Market Development Approaches (MDA) Working Group contributes to the goal of reproductive health supply security through a greater focus on the "total market", which includes the private and commercial sectors.
The Advocacy and Accountability (A&A WG) Working Group (formerly known as Resource Mobilization and Awareness Working Group RMA WG) contributes to the health and well-being of all individuals by ensuring they have access to RH commodities they want when they need them.
The Systems Strengthening Working Group aims to strengthen the global, regional, and country systems needed to ensure a reliable and predictable supply of RH commodities, primarily in the public sector.

In addition to the Working Groups the Coalition includes fora and caucuses dedicated to youth, maternal health supplies, generic manufacturers, and new and underused reproductive health technologies as well as regional fora for Latin America Foro Latinoamericano y del Caribe para el Aseguramiento de insumos de SR or LAC Forum and Francophone Africa Sécurité Contraceptive en Afrique Francophone SECONAF.

== Services ==
The Global Family Planning Visibility and Analytics Network. For nearly two decades, the RHSC has averted supply crises using resources that have become bywords in the community such as the CARhs, the CSP group, the RH Interchange, and the PPMR. In a bid to share data more effectively and dismantle old information silos, all these resources have come together under the Global Family Planning VAN (the VAN). The VAN is a shared global network that captures and uses supply chain data from multiple sources to ensure (a) more timely and cost-effective delivery of commodities to countries; (b) more women reached with the right product at the right time; and (c) better coordination on how to allocate limited health resources.

The LEAP (Landscape and Projection of Reproductive Health Supply Needs) Data Report is an interactive data tool that estimates future use and cost of reproductive health supplies. The report looks into what services or supplies women use, the quantity of supplies needed, and the cost of these supplies.

The Family Planning Market Report features family planning shipment data from 16 suppliers, providing visibility into family planning procurement in the 69 FP2020 focus countries, and synthesizes recent supplier and procurement data as well as five-year trends from 2015 to 2019.

Innovation Fund is the Reproductive Health Supplies Coalition's flagship initiative for inspiring and financing new activities that further the Coalition's strategic goals and those of its Working Groups. Established in 2008, it has granted more than $6.2 million under the Innovation Fund in 70 small grants and leveraged more than $20.6 million – a return of roughly $3.32 to $1.

Supplies Information Database (SID) is an online reference library with over 6,000 records on the status of reproductive health supplies at country-level. The library includes studies, assessments and other publications dating back to 1986, many of which are no longer available even in their country of origin.

LAPTOP is a course database that includes more than 650 training opportunities in logistics and supply chain management. For more than a decade, LAPTOP has helped students and young professionals pursue educational opportunities and advance their careers.

MarketBookshelf.com is a large and open-access collection of health market literature, offering immediate access to documents and related resources needed to understand, develop and intervene in different global health markets. It covers a broad range of health areas, including malaria, HIV/AIDS, nutrition, contraception, neonatal and child health, maternal health, tuberculosis and other communicable diseases, immunization and non-communicable disease.

== Funding ==
The Coalition is funded by the Bill & Melinda Gates Foundation, DFID, UNFPA, USAID and other members' contributions.

== Executive Committee members (May 2024) ==
- Beth Fredrick (Chair), Independent Consultant, Facilitator, and Educator, Bill and Melinda Gates Foundation
- Dr. Ayman Abdelmohsen, Chief, Family Planning Branch, Technical Division UNFPA
- Dr Clétus Come Adohinzin, Program Coordinator, WAHO
- Alan Bornbusch, Division Chief, Office of Population and Reproductive Health, USAID
- Sarah Dabbaj, Programme and Policy Manager, Global Health Foreign, Commonwealth and Development Office
- Ashish Das, General Manager – Commercial, Viatris
- Nènè Fofana-Cissé, Regional Representative West and Central Africa, EngenderHealth
- Martin Gutierrez, Presidente CE, Fòs Feminista
- Manuelle Hurwitz, International Planned Parenthood Federation
- Luc Laviolette, Program Leader, Human Development, Global Financing Facility
- Sylvia Lin, Deputy Director, Women's Health Innovation Bill & Melinda Gates Foundation
- Martyn Smith, Director, Reproductive Health Supplies Coalition
- Pamela Steele, Founder, Pamela Steele Associates
- Noortje Verhart, SRHR Expert, Ministry of Foreign Affairs of the Netherlands

== See also ==
- Birth control
- Family planning
- Infant mortality
- International Conference on Population and Development
- Maternal health
- Reproductive rights
