= Phytopharmacology =

Phytopharmacology is the study and practice of eradicating plant pathology originated from the Verbandes Deutscher Pflanzenärzte (1928–1939), (German Plant Physicians Society), headed by Otto Appel, known as the Organiser of German Plant Protection, who initially defined the terminology of Phyto-Medicine or Plant Medicine. The Deutsche Phytomedizinische Gesellschaft (German Phytomedicine Society) is the German association of phytomedicine practitioners. Academic programs in phytomedicine, such as at the University of Hohenheim, consider the interrelationships between pathogenic microorganisms and crops, disease control methods, and research programs.

In 1936, the term phytopharmacology was used for the field of study on drugs that affect plants.
