= Peter Appel =

Peter Appel may refer to:

- Peter Appel (actor) (born 1959), American actor
- Peter H. Appel (born 1964), administrator of the Research and Innovative Technology Administration
