= David Appel =

David Appel may refer to:

- David Appel (businessman) (born 1950), Israeli businessman
- David Appel (ice hockey) (born 1981), Czech ice hockey player
