= Apfel =

Apfel (German for "apple") is a German surname. Notable people with the surname include:

- Arthur Apfel (1922–2017), South African-British figure skater
- Holger Apfel (born 1970), German politician, former leader of the National Democratic Party of Germany (NPD) in Saxony
- Howard Apfel (born 1962), American Rabbi and Cardiologist
- Iris Apfel (1921–2024), American businesswoman, interior designer, and fashion icon
- Kenneth S. Apfel (born 1948), American politician, 13th Commissioner of Social Security in the United States
- Oscar Apfel (1878–1938), American film actor, film director, screenwriter and film producer

== See also ==
- Appel
- Front Deutscher Äpfel, organisation founded in Leipzig in 2004 that satirizes German right parties
- Eastern Enterprises v. Apfel, United States Supreme Court case
