= Schupp =

Schupp is a surname. Notable people with the surname include:

- Johann Balthasar Schupp (1610–1661), German theologian, diplomat, pastor, innovative preacher and author of satirical tracts
- Ferdie Schupp (1891–1971), American baseball pitcher
- Fritz Schupp (1896–1974), German architect
- Philipp Schupp (1911 – 1991), American field handball player
- Julio César Schupp (d. 2005), Paraguayan diplomat
- Paul Schupp (1937–2022), American mathematician
- Markus Schupp (born 1966), German football manager and former player
- Walt Schupp (1895–1941), American football player
- Johnny Schupp (2012-2016), American football player
