= Anna Magdalena Appel =

Anna Magdalena
- Freifrau von Hochstädten
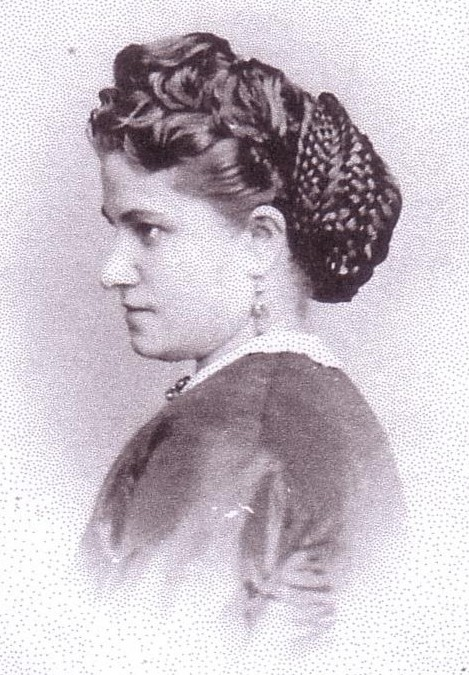
- In her youth
- Born: Anna Magdalena Appel; 8 February 1846; Darmstadt, Grand Duchy of Hesse
- Died: 19 December 1917 (aged 71); Wiesbaden, Kingdom of Prussia, German Empire
- Residence: Darmstadt, Wiesbaden
- Morganatic: Louis III, Grand Duke of Hesse (m. 1868; died 1877)
- Father: Johann Heinrich Appel
- Mother: Louise Christiane d'Amour

Anna Magdalena Appel, later known as Freifrau von Hochstädten (Darmstadt, 8 March 1846 – Wiesbaden, 19 December 1917), was a German ballet dancer, morganatic wife of Louis III, Grand Duke of Hesse.

== Biography ==
Anna Magdalena was the last child of Johann Heinrich Appel and his second wife, Louise Christiane d’Amour. Her father died a few months after her birth, on 21 November 1846.

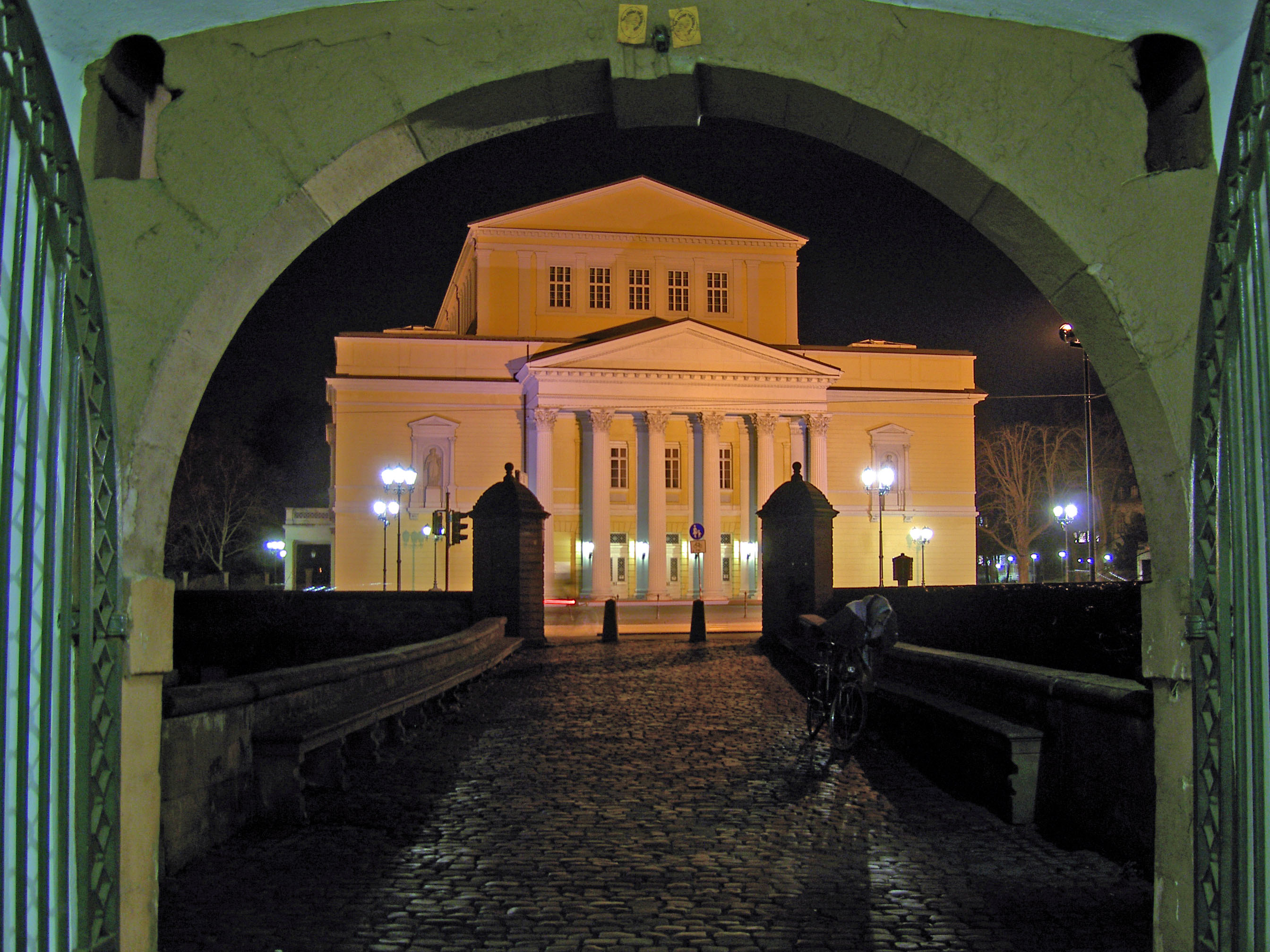
The Darmstadt's Hoftheater where she started her career.

She developed her career as a ballet dancer at the Hoftheater in Darmstadt, her home town and capital of the Grand Duchy of Hesse. In those years her sister Johanette was a solo ballerina at the same theatre, and over the years Anna Magdalena herself became a soloist dancer at the same theatre.

It was through the ballet that Anna Magdalena met Grand Duke Louis of Hesse, a great lover of the arts. Louis III was a childless widower, his wife Mathilde Caroline of Bavaria having died in 1862. After ennobling her as Freifrau von Hochstädten eleven days earlier, they married morganatically on 20 June 1868. On the occasion of the marriage, and contrary to Ludwig III's original idea, Anna Magdalena had to leave the stage at the behest of the court's Oberhofmeister (Grand Master of the Court), Freiherr Felix Maria von Capellen.

During this period, too, Anne Magdalena exercised a certain influence on the artistic affairs of the Grand Duchy.

The personality of Louis III of Hesse had changed with age, to the extent that all his palaces had rooms with similar characteristics: green rooms with mahogany furniture, which were intended to be lived in periodically. Anna Magdalena cared for her husband in his last years, especially in the moments before his death in 1877. It was in the final moments of Louis III that the Grand-Ducal family came to know Anna Magdalena, out of necessity, because she did not want to be separated from her husband in his death throes. The Grand-Ducal family always held her in high regard afterwards and granted her an annual allowance. Alexander of Hesse, brother of Louis III, described Anne Magdalene in a letter to his sister Marie, wife of Alexander II of Russia, as:

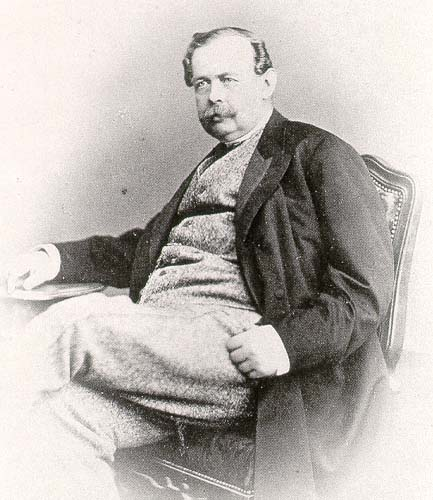
Louis III, Grand Duke of Hesse in his old age

a fine woman, aged about thirty with beautiful eyes and teeth. A real child of the people, simple and loyal, and she had looked after our brother like a nurse for years.

After the death of Louis III, Anna Magdalena moved her residence to the nearby town of Wiesbaden, located in the Kingdom of Prussia. In her last years, she fostered her niece Anna Magdalena Frobenius and travelled extensively.

She was buried in the old cemetery (Altes Friedhof) of Darmstadt.
