= Louis III of Hesse =

Grand Duke of Hesse and by Rhine from 1848 to 1877

Louis III
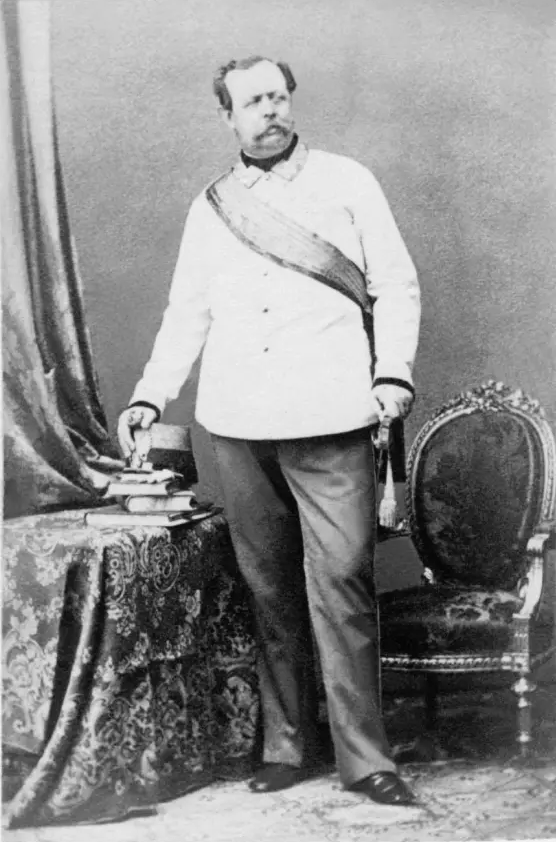
- Grand Duke Louis III

Grand Duke of Hesse and by Rhine
- Reign: 5 March 1848 – 13 June 1877
- Predecessor: Louis II
- Successor: Louis IV
- Born: 9 June 1806; Darmstadt, Hesse
- Died: 13 June 1877 (aged 71); Seeheim, Hesse
- Burial: New Mausoleum, Rosenhöhe Park, Darmstadt
- Spouse: Princess Mathilde Caroline of Bavaria (m. 1833; died 1862) Anna Magdalena, Freifrau von Hochstädten (m. 1868) (morganatic)
- House: Hesse-Darmstadt
- Father: Louis II, Grand Duke of Hesse
- Mother: Wilhelmine of Baden

Louis III (German: Ludwig; 9 June 1806, Darmstadt – 13 June 1877, Seeheim) was the grand duke of Hesse and by Rhine from 1848 until his death in 1877.

== Biography ==
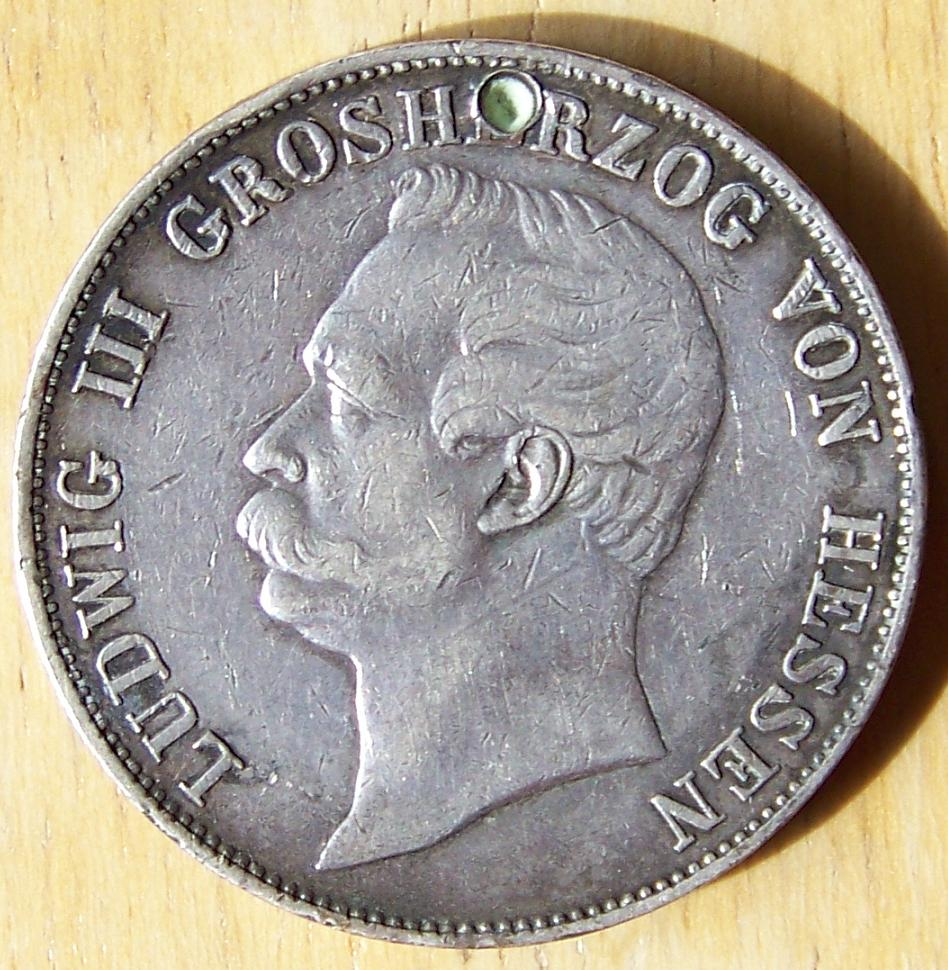
1859 thaler of Hesse, depicting Louis III

He was the son of Grand Duke Louis II of Hesse and Princess Wilhelmine of Baden. He succeeded as Grand Duke in 1848 upon the abdication of his father during the March Revolution in the German states.

During the Austro-Prussian War in 1866, Louis sent word more than once to Queen Victoria, mother-in-law of his nephew and successor Louis, appealing to her to reason on his behalf with the King of Prussia, "in the same sense I had already written before, but it would be utterly useless."

He was succeeded by his nephew, Louis IV, on 13 June 1877, as his brother Charles (Louis' father) had already died three months previously in March.

== Marriages ==
In Munich on 26 December 1833, he married Princess Mathilde Caroline of Bavaria, eldest daughter of Ludwig I of Bavaria. The marriage produced no children. Princess Mathilde Caroline died in 1862, and in 1868, the Grand Duke remarried morganatically to Magdalene Appel, who was created Baroness of Hochstädten.

== Honours and awards ==
- Baden:
  - Grand Cross of the House Order of Fidelity, 1806
  - Grand Cross of the Order of the Zähringer Lion, 1833
- Electorate of Hesse: Grand Cross of the Order of the Golden Lion, 19 February 1827
- Kingdom of Prussia:
  - Knight of the Order of the Black Eagle, 3 May 1830
  - Grand Commander's Cross of the Royal House Order of Hohenzollern, 25 April 1871
- Austrian Empire: Grand Cross of the Order of St. Stephen, 1830
- Kingdom of Bavaria: Knight of the Order of Saint Hubert, 1833
- Saxe-Weimar-Eisenach: Grand Cross of the Order of the White Falcon, 3 October 1840
- Oldenburg: Grand Cross of the House and Merit Order of Peter Frederick Louis, with Golden Crown, 11 October 1840
- Württemberg: Grand Cross of the Order of the Württemberg Crown, 1841
- Kingdom of Saxony: Knight of the Order of the Rue Crown, 1845
- Kingdom of Hanover:
  - Knight of the Order of St. George, 1851
  - Grand Cross of the Royal Guelphic Order, 1851
- Duchy of Modena and Reggio: Grand Cross of the Order of the Eagle of Este, 1856
- Nassau: Knight of the Order of the Gold Lion of the House of Nassau, December 1858
- Spain: Knight of the Order of the Golden Fleece, 6 April 1863
- Monaco: Grand Cross of the Order of Saint-Charles, 23 April 1865
- United Kingdom: Stranger Knight of the Order of the Garter, 17 June 1865

== Ancestry ==
Ancestors of Louis III of Hesse

8. Louis IX, Landgrave of Hesse-Darmstadt (= 14)
4. Louis I, Grand Duke of Hesse and by Rhine
9. Countess Palatine Caroline of Zweibrücken (= 15)
2. Louis II, Grand Duke of Hesse and by Rhine
10. Prince George William of Hesse-Darmstadt
5. Princess Louise of Hesse-Darmstadt
11. Countess Maria Louise Albertine of Leiningen-Falkenburg-Dagsburg
1. Louis III, Grand Duke of Hesse and by Rhine
12. Charles Frederick, Grand Duke of Baden
6. Charles Louis, Hereditary Prince of Baden
13. Princess Caroline Louise of Hesse-Darmstadt
3. Princess Wilhelmine of Baden
14. Louis IX, Landgrave of Hesse-Darmstadt (= 8)
7. Princess Amalie of Hesse-Darmstadt
15. Countess Palatine Caroline of Zweibrücken (= 9)

Louis III of Hesse House of Hesse-Darmstadt Born: 9 June 1806 Died: 13 June 1877
German royalty
Preceded by Louis II	Grand Duke of Hesse and by Rhine; 1848–1877	Succeeded by Louis IV
