= Anna Appel =

Anna Appel may refer to:

- Anna Appel (actress) (1888–1963), Romanian-born American stage and film actress
- Anna Magdalena Appel (1846–1917), German ballet dancer

== See also ==
- Anne Milano Appel, American translator of Italian literature and language teacher
