= Eastern Enterprises v. Apfel =

- Supreme Court of the United States

Argued March 4, 1998 Decided June 25, 1998
- Full case name: Eastern Enterprises, Petitioner v. Kenneth S. Apfel, Commissioner of Social Security, et al.
- Citations: 524 U.S. 498 (more) 118 S. Ct. 2131; 141 L. Ed. 2d 451; 1998 U.S. LEXIS 4213; 66 U.S.L.W. 4566; 22 Employee Benefits Cas. (BNA) 1225; 98 Cal. Daily Op. Service 5036; 98 Daily Journal DAR 6937; 1998 Colo. J. C.A.R. 3281; 11 Fla. L. Weekly Fed. S 755

Case history
- Prior: Eastern Enterprises v. Chater, 110 F.3d 150 (1st Cir. 1997).

Holding
- Whether a regulatory act constitutes a taking requiring compensation depends on the extent of diminution in the value of the property.

Court membership
- Chief Justice William Rehnquist Associate Justices John P. Stevens · Sandra Day O'Connor; Antonin Scalia · Anthony Kennedy; David Souter · Clarence Thomas; Ruth Bader Ginsburg · Stephen Breyer

Case opinions
- Plurality: O'Connor, joined by Rehnquist, Scalia, Thomas
- Concurrence: Thomas
- Concur/dissent: Kennedy
- Dissent: Stevens, joined by Souter, Ginsburg, Breyer
- Dissent: Breyer, joined by Stevens, Souter, Ginsburg

Laws applied
- U.S. Const. amends. V, XIV; Coal Industry Retiree Health Benefit Act of 1992

Eastern Enterprises v. Apfel, 524 U.S. 498 (1998), is a United States Supreme Court case in which the Court held that the Coal Industry Retiree Health Benefit Act (Coal Act) constituted an unconstitutional regulatory taking of property which required the Act to be invalidated. The import of this decision is that it was made in the context of a purely economic regulation. The plurality examines the statute and its resultant harm as an ad hoc factual inquiry based on factors delineated in Penn Central Transportation Co. v. New York City, such as the economic impact of the regulation, its interference with reasonable investment backed expectations, and the character of the governmental action. The decision thereby moved beyond the traditional notions of equal protection which had been applied to economic regulation since the time of Lochner v. New York, requiring extreme deference to Congress, and applied a regulatory takings analysis to the problem resulting in a much less deferential result. While the plurality recognizes that this is not a traditional takings case where the government appropriates private property for public use, they also state this is the type of case where the "Armstrong Principle" of preventing the government from forcing some people alone to bear public burdens which, in all fairness and justice, should be borne by the public as a whole. However, while the plurality seems to invalidate this particular law on takings grounds, the concurrences and the dissents warn of such an analysis as this should actually be examined under substantive due process or ex post facto theories.

== Parties ==
Plaintiff/Petitioner
Eastern Enterprises, former coal company that had been assessed the responsibility to fund pensions of many former employees as a function of the Coal Industry Retiree Health Benefit Act of 1992
Defendant/Respondent
Kenneth S. Apfel, Commissioner of Social Security
Amici Curiae
BITUMINOUS COAL OPERATORS' ASSOCIATION, INC., UMWA COMBINED BENEFIT FUND AND ITS TRUSTEES, and the representatives of other extensive interests.

== Background ==
=== State of law ===
There are actually several different legal doctrines at work in this case. First, the case was decided under United States Supreme Court takings jurisprudence. The plurality looked to the factors enunciated in Penn Central to determine if the enacted legislation functioned to deprive Eastern Enterprises of property without just compensation. Since Penn Central, the factors enunciated by Justice Brennan therein have been used to determine when a regulation rises to the level of a taking thereby requiring just compensation under the Fifth Amendment. Second, since Lochner v. New York the Court has been reluctant to find on due process grounds that economic regulation was beyond the power of Congress. Third, the Coal Industry Retiree Health Benefit Act of 1992 was passed to remedy the insolvent pension plans of the coal mining labors which had been in place since the 1950s. Fourth, and perhaps not independent, the Court examined the ex post facto nature of the effect of the Coal Industry Retiree Health Benefit Act of 1992 on Eastern. The majority examined such under its Penn Central analysis while the concurrence and the dissents actually looked at it as a distinct basis to hold the Congressional Act unconstitutional.

=== Facts of case ===
In 1950 and 1974, the Coal Mining industry established a pension plan for its workers. Under the plans, workers and their families believed they were to receive a pension and future healthcare. The healthcare aspects of the plan however, were disputed and the Coal Companies did not provide the health care as expected. As time wore on, the pensions slowly sank into depression as more and more coal operators withdrew from plan. Eastern Enterprises was a signatory to the pension plans since 1950 until it sold off its holdings in coal operations in 1987. In 1992 Congress passed the Coal Industry Retiree Health Benefit Act of 1992 which required former Coal Operators to pay into the pension in certain situations when the former employee had worked for the company. Such requirement was in place even when the operator no longer was in the Coal Industry. Here, Eastern Enterprises was required to pay into the pension plans for some 100 past employees even though it had sold off its holdings in coal operations.

=== Prior history ===
Eastern Enterprises filed suit against the Commissioner of Social Security in the District Court of Massachusetts. The District Court granted Summary Judgment for the Respondent and upheld the Commissioner's interpretation of the statute. Eastern Enterprises then appealed to the United States Court of Appeals for the First Circuit which affirmed the lower court's holding. The Supreme Court granted Certiorari.

=== Procedural posture ===
Eastern Enterprises seeks reversal of the order granting summary judgment.

== Legal analysis ==
=== Issue ===
The Plurality considered the issue of (1) whether the Coal Industry Retiree Health Benefit Act of 1992 as applied to Eastern Enterprises constitutes a taking for which just compensation is required

=== Arguments/theories ===
Plurality: The statute violates the Penn Central factors and is thus a compensable taking. Specifically, Eastern Enterprises' (1) economic impact is substantial, (2) the Act interferes substantially with distinct investment backed expectations, and (3) the nature of the government action is unusual as it requires certain individuals to bear a substantial burden, and it does so retroactively. Concurrence: The statute is unconstitutional because it is an ex post facto law that retroactively imposes liability. Dissent: Takings jurisprudence should not be employed to decide if an economic regulation is proper. Traditional notions of due process are to be employed in such instances requiring an examination under rational basis scrutiny.

=== Rule of law ===
The plurality ruled that the Penn Central factors applied in cases of economic regulation as a way to find a statute unconstitutional when it effects a taking of property for public use without just compensation. (Rule is limited by the fact that this is a plurality)

=== Holding ===
The Court held that (1) the Coal Industry Retiree Health Benefit Act of 1992 as applied to Eastern Enterprises constitutes an unconstitutional taking, requiring the statute to be enjoined;

=== Reasoning ===
The Plurality argued as follows: (1) The economic impact of the Coal Industry Retiree Health Benefit Act of 1992 resulted was substantial as to Petitioner in that it forced Eastern Enterprises to contribute millions of dollars to a pension fund for employees is employed in the 1950s and 1960s solely because those payments could not be allocated to other Coal Companies that were currently operating in the coal industry. The Plurality said that the retroactive effect of the statute worked a substantial economic injury on Eastern that could not have been anticipated (2) The statute interferes with distinct investment backed expectations of Eastern Enterprises for much the same reason. In 1987 Eastern Enterprises sold off its remaining holdings in Coal operations and as such completely removed itself from the industry. The statute's requirement that Eastern Enterprises now undertake the obligation at issue clearly interfered with expectations of Eastern when it sold off its interest in coal operations. (3) The nature of the government action was such that it retroactively applied a substantial economic burden on Eastern Enterprises and such is unusual. The character of the government action is substantial and invasive. The balance of the factors lead towards a finding of an unconstitutional taking requiring just compensation.

=== Notable concurring and dissenting opinions ===
Kennedy, J., concurring.
Justice Kennedy concurs in judgment, but feels that the takings analysis employed by the Plurality is unnecessary. Justice Kennedy explained that the retroactive nature of the law results in its unconstitutionality without having to resort to a takings analysis. Justice Kennedy goes even further to state that the takings analysis of the Plurality is not supported by the prevailing case law as no specific property interest was taken as a function of the statute.
Stevens, J., dissenting.
Regardless of how the statute is analyzed, the Petitioner has not met the required burden to overcome the presumption of constitutionality that accompanies a Congressional Act.
Breyer, J., dissenting.
There is no need to torture the takings clause to fit this case. The matter should be evaluated under the due process clause and traditional notions of fundamental fairness. The law imposes upon Eastern the burden of showing that the statute, because of its retroactive effect, is fundamentally unfair or unjust. Eastern has failed to show that the law unfairly upset its legitimately settled expectations.

== Result ==
=== Judgment/disposition ===
Court of Appeals First Circuit judgment reversed and matter remanded.

=== Subsequent history ===
The holding of this case has been continually called into question. Most recently Empress Casino Joliet Corp. v. Giannoulias, 231 Ill.2d 62, 896 N.E.2d 277, 324 Ill.Dec. 491 (Ill. Jun 05, 2008) specifically relied on Justice Breyer's interpretation and determined that in cases of economic regulation the Petitioner must overcome the presumption of Constitutionality with a showing of fundamental unfairness. While the case has not been overruled, it is continually questioned in many State Supreme Courts and Courts of Appeal. Currently a writ of certiorari is pending in the Empress Casino Joliet Corp. v. Giannoulias case which has not yet been decided upon. Additionally, the Court's ruling did not provide relief to coal companies similarly situated to Eastern who had settled their constitutional claims prior to the Court's ruling rather than pursuing appellate litigation.

=== Selected articles ===
- Michael Allen Wolf, "TAKING REGULATORY TAKINGS PERSONALLY: THE PERILS OF (MIS)REASONING BY ANALOGY," 51 Ala. L. Rev. 1355 (2000)

A coalition of corporations and individuals formerly in the coal industry and severely diminished by imposition of the so-called Reachback Tax resisted this illegal taking for over six years through a coalition. The Eastern Enterprises v. Apfel case brought some partial and desperately needed relief from the Reachback Tax to dozens of corporations, mom and pop companies and even individuals economically ravaged by the mandate to pay for healthcare benefits for individuals who had virtually no association with those being taxed or assessed the obligations of the Coal Industry Retiree Health Benefit Act of 1992. That act provided for arguably the most generous fully paid healthcare benefits in the nation, including pregnancy termination for family members of those designated as beneficiaries of the Reachback Tax. The anti-Reachback Tax Coalition toiled at local, state and national levels to effect relief. The efforts of the coalition included numerous Federal district court cases and appeals prior to the Supreme Court's landmark Eastern v. Apfel ruling. Those efforts included a series of paid media op-eds addressed to former U.S. Senator Jay Rockefeller (D-W.Va.), an original sponsor of the act and tax, which appeared on Page 3 of The Washington Post. Jones, Day, Reavis & Pogue's Washington office coordinated that coalition through its long-time Congressional consultant Sam Richardson.

== See also ==
- List of United States Supreme Court cases, volume 524
- List of United States Supreme Court cases
- Lists of United States Supreme Court cases by volume
