= Latin American Integration Association =

Latin American multinational organization

(in official languages)
Spanish	Asociación Latinoamericana de Integración
Portuguese	Associação Latino-Americana de Integração
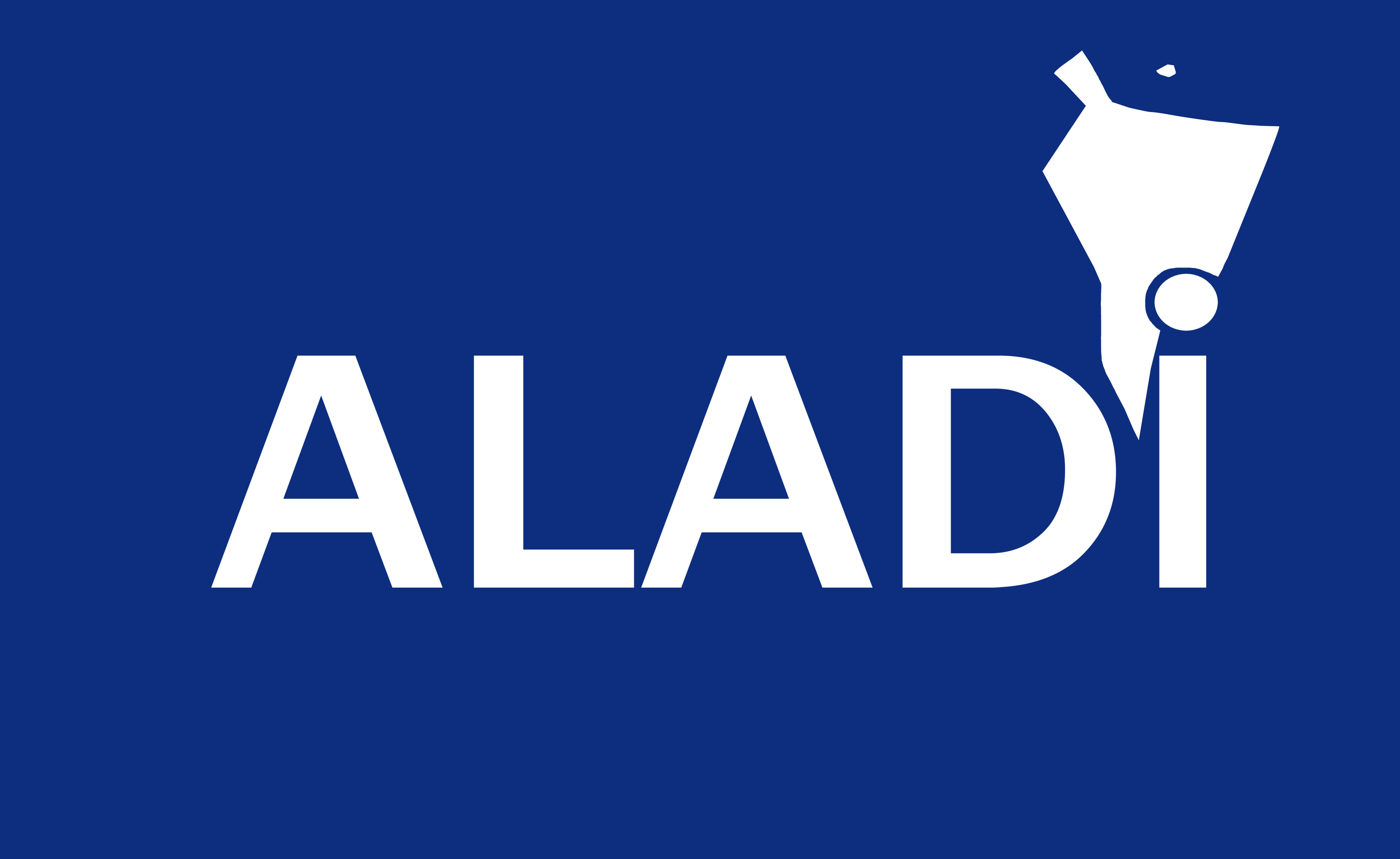
- Flag

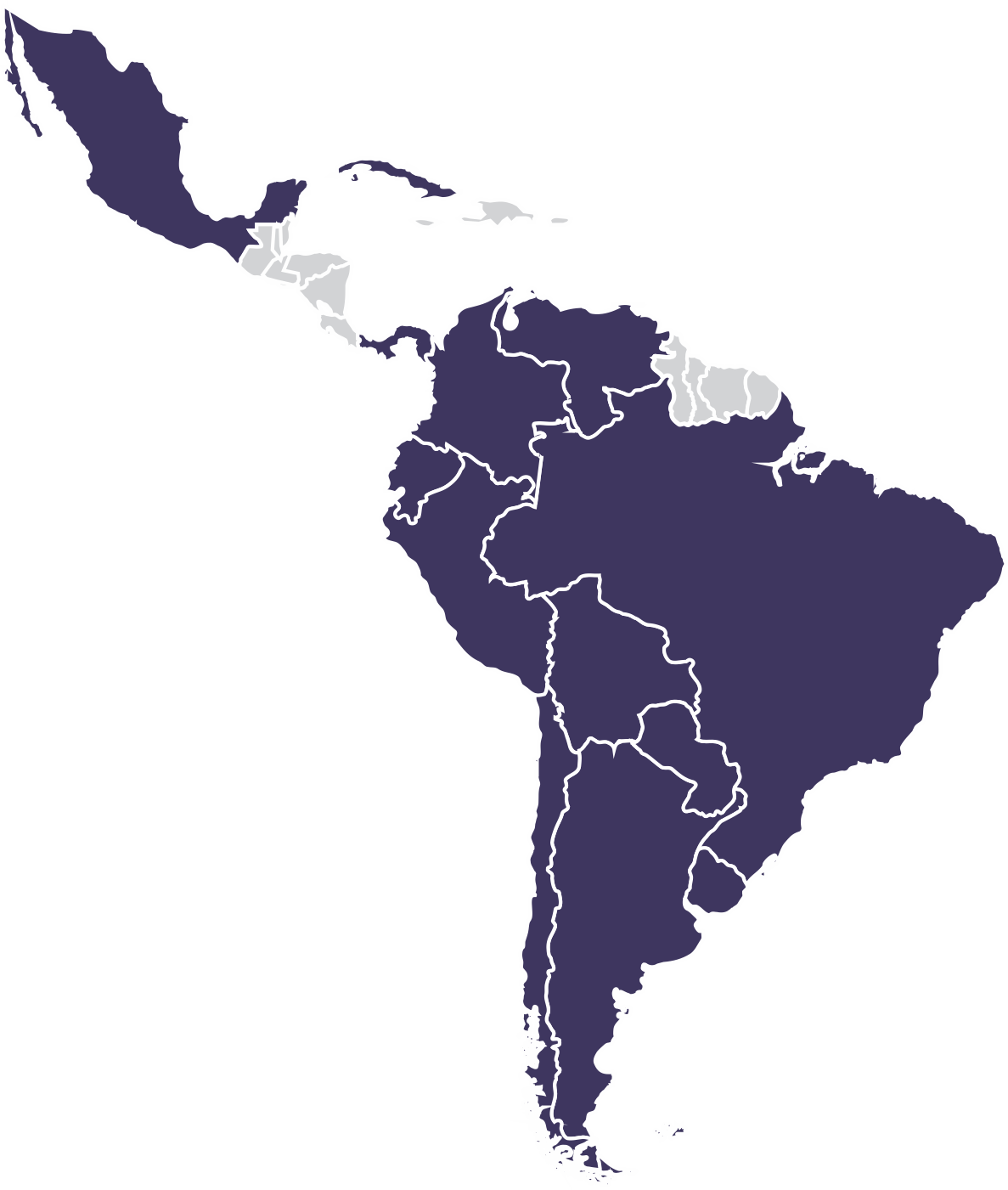
- Administrative center: Montevideo, Uruguay
- Working languages: Spanish; Portuguese
- Type: Trade bloc
- Membership: 13 members: Argentina; Bolivia; Brazil; Chile; Colombia; Cuba; Ecuador; Mexico; Paraguay; Panama; Peru; Uruguay; Venezuela

Leaders
  - Secretary General: Sergio Abreu

Establishment
  - Treaty of Montevideo: 12 August 1980
- Website http://www.aladi.org/

The Latin American Integration Association / Asociación Latinoamericana de Integración / Associação Latino-Americana de Integração (LAIA / ALADI) is an international and regional scope organization. It was created on 12 August 1980 by the 1980 Montevideo Treaty, replacing the Latin American Free Trade Association (LAFTA/ALALC). Currently, it has 13 member countries, and any of the Latin American States may apply for accession.

== Objectives ==
The development of the integration process developed within the framework of the ALADI aims at promoting the harmonious and balanced socio-economic development of the region, and its long-term objective is the gradual and progressive establishment of a Latin-American single market.

== Basic functions ==
- Promotion and regulation of reciprocal trade
- Economic complementation
- Development of economic cooperation actions contributing to the markets extension.

== General principles ==
- Pluralism in political and economic matters;
- Progressive convergence of partial actions for the establishment of a Latin-American Common Market;
- Flexibility;
- Differential treatments based on the development level of the member countries; and
- Multiple forms of trade agreements.

== Integration mechanisms ==
The ALADI promotes the establishment of an area of economic preferences within the region, in order to create a Latin-American common market, through three mechanisms:

- A Regional Tariff Preference applied to goods from the member countries compared to tariffs in-force for third countries.
- Regional Scope Agreements, those in which all member countries participate.
- Partial Scope Agreements, those wherein two or more countries of the area participate.

The Relatively Less Economically Developed Countries of the region (Bolivia, Ecuador and Paraguay) benefit from a preferential system, through the lists of markets opening offered by the countries in favor of the Relatively Less Economically Developed Countries; special programs of cooperation (business rounds, pre-investment, financing, technological support); and countervailing measures in favor of the land-locked countries, the full participation of such countries in the integration process is sought. The ALADI includes in its legal structure the strongest sub-regional, plurilateral and bilateral integration agreements arising in growing numbers in the continent. As a result, the ALADI – as an institutional and legal framework or “umbrella” of the regional integration- develops actions in order to support and foster these efforts for the progressive establishment of a common economic space.

== Member states ==
State Members	Join Date	Population	Land Surface	Exclusive Economic Zone	Platform	Capital City
Argentina	Founder	40,117,096	2,780,400 km^{2}	1,084,386 km^{2}	856,346 km^{2}	Buenos Aires
Bolivia	Founder	10,426,160	1,098,581 km^{2}	Landlocked		Sucre & La Paz
Brazil	Founder	190,732,694	8,514,877 km^{2}	3,660,955 km^{2}	774,563 km^{2}	Brasília
Chile	Founder	17,094,275	756,096.3 km^{2}	3,681,989 km^{2}	252,947 km^{2}	Santiago de Chile
Colombia	Founder	45,656,937	1,141,748 km^{2}	817,816 km^{2}	53,691 km^{2}	Bogotá
Cuba	1999	11,242,621	110,860 km^{2}	350,751 km^{2}	61,525 km^{2}	Havana
Ecuador	Founder	14,306,876	283,561 km^{2}	1,072,533 km^{2}	41,034 km^{2}	Quito
Mexico	Founder	112,322,757	1,972,550 km^{2}	3,177,593 km^{2}	419,102 km^{2}	Mexico City
Paraguay	Founder	7,030,917	406,752 km^{2}	Landlocked		Asunción
Panama	2011	3,405,813	78,200 km^{2}	335,646 km^{2}	53,404 km^{2}	Panama City
Peru	Founder	29,885,340	1,285,215.6 km^{2}	906,454 km^{2}	82,000 km^{2}	Lima
Uruguay	Founder	3,424,595	176,215 km^{2}	142,166 km^{2}	75,327 km^{2}	Montevideo
Venezuela	Founder	30,102,382	916,445 km^{2}	860,000 km^{2}	98,500 km^{2}	Caracas
Total:		521,213,563	19,651,873 km^{2}	16,214,170 km^{2}	2,839,313 km^{2}	

== Accession of other Latin American countries ==
A clickable Euler diagram showing the relationships between various multinational organizations in the Americas

The 1980 Montevideo Treaty is open to the accession of any Latin-American country. On 26 August 1999, the first accession to the 1980 Montevideo Treaty was executed, with the incorporation of the Republic of Cuba as a member country of the ALADI. On 10 May 2012, the Republic of Panama became the thirteenth member country of the ALADI. Likewise, the accession of the Republic of Nicaragua was accepted in the Sixteenth Meeting of the Council of Ministers (Resolution 75 (XVI)), held on 11 August 2011.

Currently, Nicaragua moves towards the fulfillment of conditions for becoming a member country of the ALADI.

The ALADI opens its field of actions for the rest of Latin America through multilateral links or partial agreements with other countries and integration areas of the continent (Article 25). The Latin-American Integration Association also contemplates the horizontal cooperation with other integration movements in the world and partial actions with third developing countries or their respective integration areas (Article 27).

== Institutional structure ==
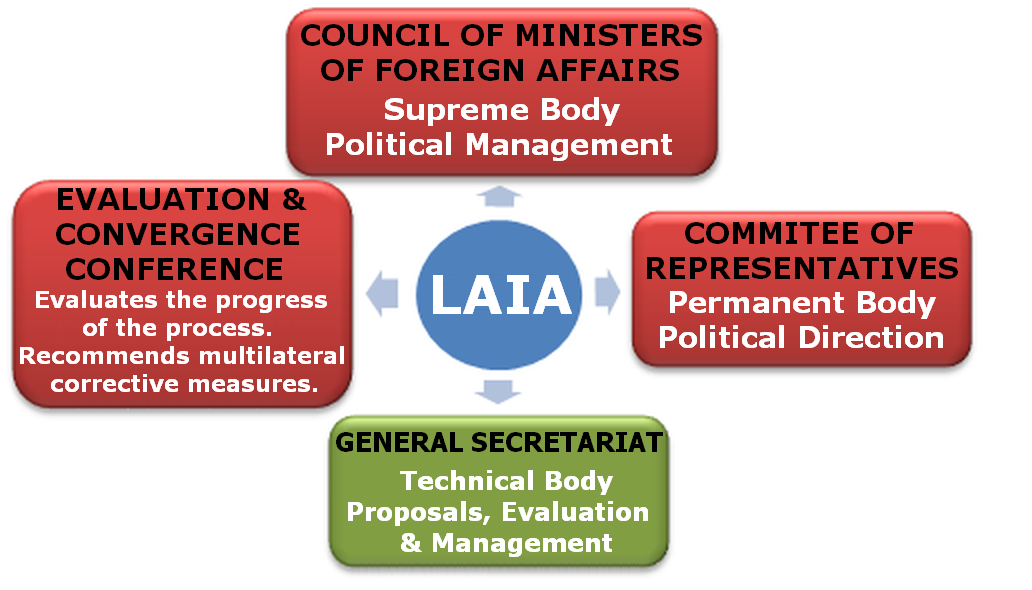
ALADI - Institutional Structure

Council of Ministers of Foreign Affairs

The Council of Ministers is the supreme body of the ALADI, and adopts the decisions for the superior political management of the integration process. It is constituted by the Ministers of Foreign Affairs of the member countries. Notwithstanding, when one of such member countries assigns the competence of the integration affairs to a different Minister or Secretary of State, the member countries may be represented, with full powers, by the respective Minister or Secretary. It is convened by the Committee of Representatives, meets and makes decisions with the presence of all the member countries.

Evaluation and Convergence Conference

It is in charge, among others, of analyzing the functioning of the integration process in all its aspects, promoting the convergence of the partial scope agreements seeking their progressive multilateralization, and promoting greater scope actions as regards economic integration. It is made up of Plenipotentiaries of the member countries.

Committee of Representatives

It is the permanent political body and negotiating forum of the ALADI, where all the initiatives for the fulfillment of the objectives established by the 1980 Montevideo Treaty are analyzed and agreed on. It is composed of a Permanent Representative of each member country with right to one vote and an Alternate Representative. It meets regularly every 15 days and its Resolutions are adopted by the affirmative vote of two thirds of the member countries.

General Secretariat

It is the technical body of the ALADI, and it may propose, evaluate, study and manage for the fulfillment of the objectives of the ALADI. It is composed of technical and administrative personnel, and directed by a Secretary-General, who has the support of two Undersecretaries, elected for a three-year period, renewable for the same term.

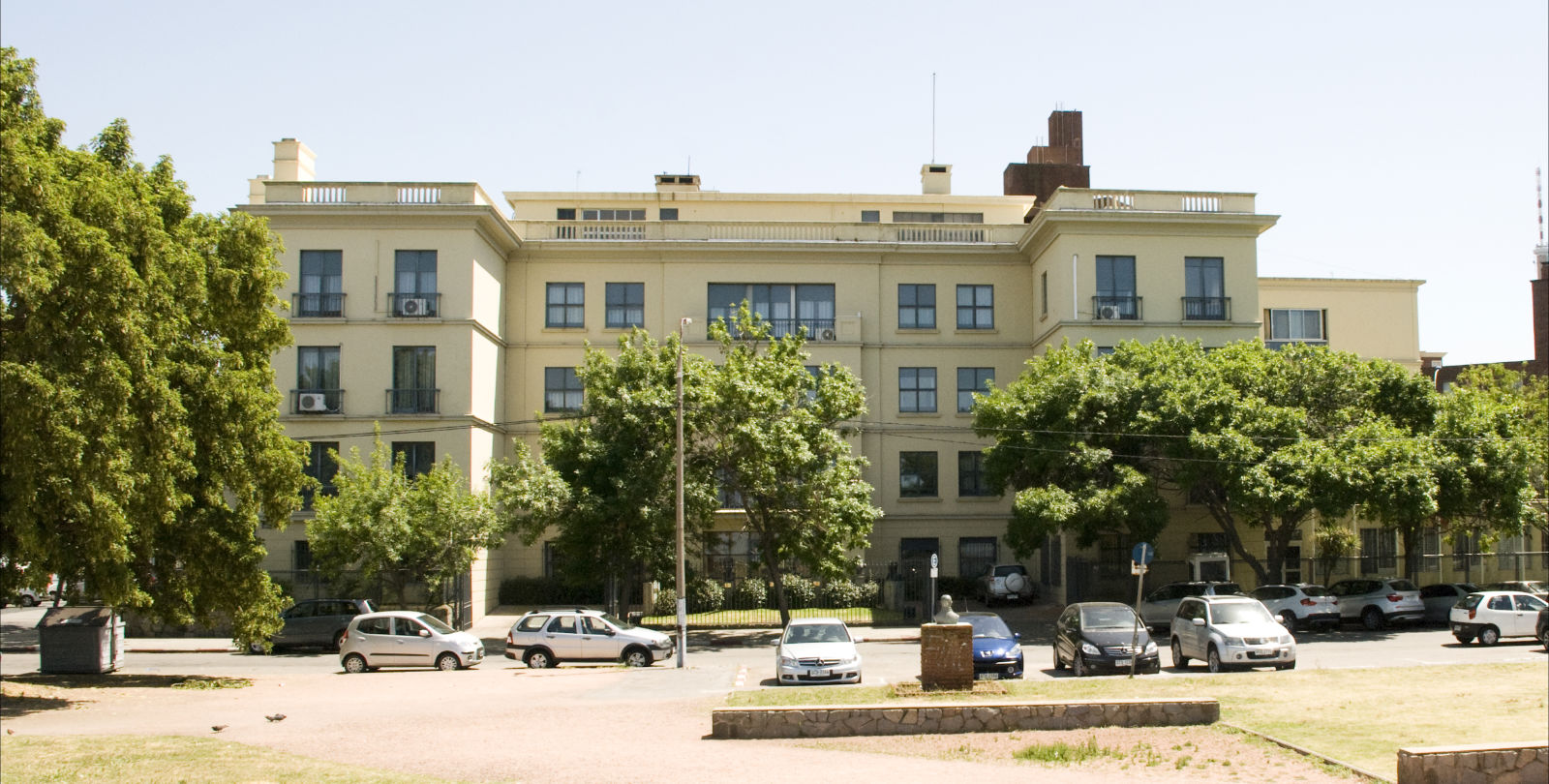
Montevideo, ALADI's site.

== Secretaries general ==
- 1980–1984 Julio César Schupp (Paraguay)
- 1984–1987 Juan José Real (Uruguay)
- 1987–1990 Norberto Bertaina (Argentina)
- 1990–1993 Jorge Luis Ordóñez (Colombia)
- 1993–1999 (Brazil) Antônio José de Cerqueira Antunes (Brasil)
- 2000–2005 Juan Francisco Rojas Penso (Venezuela)
- 2005–2008 Didier Opertti (Uruguay)
- 2008–2009 Bernardino Hugo Saguier-Caballero (Paraguay)
- 2009–2011 José Félix Fernández Estigarribia (Paraguay)
- 2011–2017 Carlos Álvarez (Argentina)
- 2017–2020 Alejandro de la Peña Navarrete (Mexico
- 2020– Sergio Abreu (Uruguay)

== See also ==
- Andean Community
- Association of Caribbean States
- Caribbean Community
- Central American Integration System
- Community of Latin American and Caribbean States
- Latin American economy
- Latin American Economic System
- Latin American Parliament
- Mercosur
- Pacific Alliance
- Union of South American Nations
