= Lawrence Appel =

American academic

Lawrence J Appel, MD, MPH is a physician-scientist and Professor at Johns Hopkins University with appointments in the Schools of Medicine (Department of Medicine, Division of General Internal Medicine), Public Health (Departments of Epidemiology and International Health), Nursing, and Engineering (Malone Center). In July, 2026, he retired from the full-time faculty at Hopkins but continues to conduct research as a part-time faculty member. His research has focused on the prevention and control of hypertension and its cardiovascular-kidney complications. He is particularly well known for his expertise on lowering blood pressure through sodium reduction, adoption of the DASH diet, and weight loss.

During the course of his career, he was the C. David Molina Professor of Medicine (2014-16); Director of the Welch Center for Prevention, Epidemiology and Clinical Research, (2010-24), and Medical Director of the ProHealth Clinical Research Unit (1996-2026), where he did most of his research. He has spent his entire 40+ years of professional career at Johns Hopkins.

== Biography ==
Dr. Appel was born in Holyoke, Massachusetts, to Irma Appel, a nurse, and John F. Appel, a physician. He attended Holyoke public schools, and in 1973, graduated from Holyoke High School (valedictorian). In 1977, he graduated from Dartmouth College with an A.B. degree (Magna cum Laude). In 1981, he received his M.D. degree from the New York University School of Medicine. Between 1981 and 1985, he trained in general internal medicine at Baltimore City Hospital (now Johns Hopkins Bayview Medical Center) and was Chief Medical Resident from 1984 to 1985, after which he was a primary care internist at Care First for one year. Between 1986 and 1989, he was a Clinical Research fellow in General Internal Medicine at Johns Hopkins University and received his M.P.H. from the Johns Hopkins School of Hygiene and Public Health, now the Bloomberg School of Public Health. In 1989, he joined the faculty of the Division of General Internal Medicine in the Department of Medicine at Johns Hopkins University School of Medicine as a Clinician Investigator. In 2002, he was promoted to Professor of Medicine, and in 2010, was appointed Director of the Welch Center for Prevention, Epidemiology and Clinical Research. In 2014, he was the inaugural receipt of the C. David Molina Endowed Chair of Medicine. Appel joined the faculty of Johns Hopkins University in 1989, and became the director of their Welch Center for Prevention, Epidemiology and Clinical Research in 2010.

== Research ==
Dr. Appel’s research has focused on the prevention and control of hypertension and its cardiovascular-kidney complications through clinical, epidemiological and translational research. His principal lines of investigation are fourfold:

- controlled feeding trials (most notably, the DASH clinical trial), which tested optimal dietary strategies to lower blood pressure and reduce cardiovascular risk;
- behavioral intervention trials aimed at achieving sustainable lifestyle modification, often targeting obesity;
- cohort studies and trials related to the prevention and management of chronic diseases and other conditions, particularly chronic kidney disease;
- global translational efforts to prevent and control hypertension, specifically, the Resolve to Save Lives Initiative (funded by Bloomberg Philanthropies). He has conducted projects in numerous countries, including Egypt, Ethiopia, Nigeria, Tanzania, Bangladesh, India, and the Philippines.

Dr. Appel has designed and conducted numerous studies, most investigator-initiated and many considered landmark studies. In these studies, he typically led the research effort, serving as Principal Investigator and, for multi-center studies, also serving as Steering Committee chair. Over the course of his career, he has conducted and led clinical trials, cohort studies, systematic reviews, meta-analyses, and modeling studies.

Key features of his career are as follows:

- Well-recognized expertise in designing and implementing intervention studies targeting common diseases and conditions that have a substantial societal burden, particularly hypertension that affects over 1.7 billion adults worldwide.;
- A sustained commitment to reducing health and health care disparities through tailored, evidence-based interventions.;
- A deep dedication to mentorship, reflected in his training of medical students, graduate students, postdoctoral fellows, and faculty. Given his commitment to education, he has received numerous teaching and mentoring awards.
- Authorship of > 700 scientific papers, many as lead or senior author, cited over 200,000 times.

Perhaps his most influential scientific contribution is the Dietary Approaches to Stop Hypertension (DASH) trial. As Chair of the trial’s Steering Committee and lead author of its primary publication (New England Journal of Medicine, 1997), Dr. Appel helped establish the DASH dietary pattern as a cornerstone of hypertension treatment. This landmark NIH-funded study demonstrated that dietary modification could be as effective as pharmacologic therapy in lowering blood pressure. Today, the DASH diet has been recommended in the US Dietary Guidelines and endorsed by major organizations—including the American Heart Association, American College of Cardiology, National Heart, Lung, and Blood Institute, and the International Society of Hypertension—as a first-line, evidence-based intervention. Besides its immediate impact on nutrition and prevention policy, the DASH trial catalyzed a broad body of research demonstrating that adherence to this dietary pattern reduces the risk of numerous outcomes, including stroke, myocardial infarction, heart failure, cognitive decline, kidney disease progression, hypertensive disorders of pregnancy, kidney stones, non-alcoholic fatty liver disease, and diabetes.

== Service ==
Dr. Appel has been actively involved in shaping policy, often focused on nutrition or the prevention and control of hypertension. For the National Academy of Medicine, he has been a member of several committees and chaired the 2005 committee that set dietary reference intakes for sodium, potassium, water, and sulfate. He was a member of the 2005 and 2010 U.S. Dietary Guidelines Scientific Advisory Committees. For the American Heart Association, he chaired its Nutrition Committee and its Council on Lifestyle and Cardiometabolic Health. For the National Institutes of Health, he served as a member or chair of several advisory panels; study sections for grant reviews; and data, safety and monitoring committees, notably, chair of the monitoring committee of the landmark SPRINT Trial.

== Awards ==
- 1982 Rathbun Award for Clinical Excellence, Baltimore City Hospital
- 1984-85 Chief Medical Resident, Baltimore City Hospital
- 1997 Top Ten Research Award for the DASH Clinical Trial, American Heart Association
- 2002-4 Chair, Committee on Dietary Reference Intakes for Sodium, Potassium, Sulfate and Water, Institute of Medicine
- 2008 David M. Levine Excellence in Mentoring Award
- 2012 National Award for Career Achievement and Contribution to Clinical and Translational Science
- 2012 Elected Member, National Academy of Medicine (NAM), formerly Institute of Medicine (IOM)
- 2014,16-19,20 Most Influential Scientists (top 1% of highly cited papers), awarded by Web of Science
- 2015 Elected Member, Association of American Physicians (AAP)
- 2016 Marvin Moser Clinical Hypertension Award, American Society of Hypertension
- 2016 Women Faculty Sponsorship Award, from the Task Force on Women’s Academic Careers in Medicine, Johns Hopkins Department of Medicine
- 2018 Distinguished Scientist, American Heart Association
- 2025 Inaugural Recipient, Mentoring Award, Council on Lifestyle and Cardiometabolic Health of the American Heart Association
- 2026 Research Achievement Award, American Heart Association

== Publications ==
Below is a partial list of his most influential papers:

1. Appel LJ, Moore TL, Obarzanek E et al. A clinical trial of the effects of dietary patterns on blood pressure. DASH Collaborative Research Group. N Engl J Med. 1997 Apr 17;336(16):1117-24. PMID: 9099655.
2. Sacks FM, Svetkey LP, Vollmer WM, Appel LJ et al; DASH-Sodium Collaborative Research Group. A clinical trial of the effects on blood pressure of reduced dietary sodium and the DASH dietary pattern (The DASH-Sodium Trial). N Engl J Med. 2001 Jan;344(1):3-10. PMID: 11136953.
3. Appel LJ, Espeland MA, Easter L et al. Effects of reduced sodium intake on hypertension control in older-aged individuals: Results from the Trial of Non-Pharmacologic Interventions in the Elderly (TONE). Archives of Internal Medicine. 2001;161:685-693. PMID: 11231700.
4. Writing Group of the PREMIER Collaborative Research Group (L. Appel, chair, writing group). Effects of comprehensive lifestyle modification on blood pressure control: main results of the PREMIER clinical trial. JAMA. 2003 Apr 23-30;289(16):2083-93. PMID: 12709466.
5. Dietary Reference Intakes for Water, Potassium, Sodium, Chloride, and Sulfate, Washington, DC: The National Academies Press, 2005. DOI: 10.17226/10925).
6. Miller ER, Pastor-Barriuso R, Dalal D, Riemersma RA, Appel LJ, Guallar E. Meta-analysis: high-dosage vitamin E supplementation may increase all-cause mortality. Ann Intern Med. 2005 Jan 4;142(1):37-46. PMID: 15537682.
7. Appel LJ, Sacks FM, Carey V et al for the OmniHeart Collaborative Research Group. Effects of protein, monounsaturated fat, and carbohydrate intake on blood pressure and serum lipids: results of the OmniHeart randomized trial. JAMA. 2005 Nov 16;294(19):2455-64. PMID: 16287956.
8. Appel LJ, Brands MW , Daniels SR et all American Heart Association. Dietary approaches to prevent and treat hypertension: a scientific statement from the American Heart Association. Hypertension. 2006 Feb;47(2):296-308. PMID: 16434724.
9. Appel LJ, Brands MW , Daniels SR et all American Heart Association. Dietary approaches to prevent and treat hypertension: a scientific statement from the American Heart Association. Hypertension. 2006 Feb;47(2):296-308. PMID: 16434724.
10. Svetkey LP, Stevens VJ, Brantley PJ, Appel LJ et al; Weight Loss Maintenance Collaborative Research Group. Comparison of strategies for sustaining weight loss: the weight loss maintenance randomized controlled trial. JAMA. 2008 Mar 12;299(10):1139-48. PMID: 18334689.
11. Appel LJ, Wright JT, Greene T et al. Intensive Blood-Pressure Control in Hypertensive Chronic Kidney Disease. N Engl J Med. 2010 Sep 2:363(10):918-29. PMC3662974.
12. Appel LJ, Clark JM, Yeh HC et al. Comparative Effectiveness of Weight-Loss Interventions in Clinical Practice. N Eng J Med. 2011 Nov 24:365(21):1959-68. PMID 22085317.
13. Daumit GL, Dickerson FB, Wang NY, Dalcin A, Jerome GJ, Anderson CA, Young DR, Frick KD, Yu A, Gennusa JV 3rd, Oefinger M, Crum RM, Charleston J, Casagrande SS, Guallar E, Goldberg RW, Campbell LM, Appel LJ. A behavioral weight-loss intervention in persons with serious mental illness. N Engl J Med. 2013 Apr 25;368(17):1594-602. PMID:23517118.
14. Parsa A, Kao WH, Xie D, Astor BC, Li M, Hsu CY, Feldman HI, Parekh RS, Kusek JW, Greene TH, Fink JC, Anderson AH, Choi MJ, Wright JT Jr, Lash JP, Freedman BI, Ojo A, Winkler CA, Raj DS, Kopp JB, He J, Jensvold NG, Tao K, Lipkowitz MS, Appel LJ; AASK Study Investigators; CRIC Study Investigators. APOL1 risk variants, race, and progression of chronic kidney disease. N Engl J Med. 2013 Dec 5;369(23):2183-96. PMID: 24206458
15. Sacks FM, Carey VJ, Anderson CA … Appel LJ. Effects of high vs low glycemic index of dietary carbohydrate on cardiovascular disease risk factors and insulin sensitivity: the OmniCarb randomized clinical trial. JAMA. 2014 Dec 17; 312(23):2531-41. PMID: 25514303.
16. Marklund M, Singh G, Greer R, Cudhea F, Matsushita K, Micha R, Brady T, Zhao D, Huang L, Tian M, Cobb L, Neal B, Appel LJ, Mozaffarian D, Wu JHY. Estimated population wide benefits and risks in China of lowering sodium through potassium enriched salt substitution: modelling study. BMJ. 2020 Apr 22;369:m824. doi:10.1136bmj.m824. PMID: 32321724.
17. Appel LJ, Michos ED, Mitchell CM, Blackford AL, Sternberg AL, Miller Iii ER, Juraschek SP, Schrack JA, Szanton SL, Charleston J, Minotti M, Baksh SN, Christenson RH, Coresh J, Drye LT, Guralnik JM, Kalyani RR, Plante TB, Shade DM, Roth DL, Tonascia J.. The Effects of Four Doses of Vitamin D Supplements on Falls in Older Adults : A Response-Adaptive, Randomized Clinical Trial. Ann Intern Med 2020 Dec 8. PMID: 33284677.
18. Lichtenstein AH, Appel LJ, Vadiveloo M, Hu FB, Kris-Etherton PM, Rebholz CM, Sacks FM, Thorndike AN, Van Horn L, Wylie-Rosett J. 2021 Dietary Guidance to Improve Cardiovascular Health: A Scientific Statement From the American Heart Association. Circulation 2021 Dec 7;144. PMID: 34724806.
19. Sullivan DJ, Gebo KA, Shoham S, Bloch EM, Lau B, Shenoy AG, Mosnaim GS, Gniadek TJ, Fukuta Y, Patel B, Heath SL, Levine AC, Meisenberg BR, Spivak ES, Anjan S, Huaman MA, Blair JE, Currier JS, Paxton JH, Gerber JM, Petrini JR, Broderick PB, Rausch W, Cordisco ME, Hammel J, Greenblatt B, Cluzet VC, Cruser D, Oei K, Abinante M, Hammitt LL, Sutcliffe CG, Forthal DN, Zand MS, Cachay ER, Raval JS, Kassaye SG, Foster EC, Roth M, Marshall CE, Yarava A, Lane K, McBee NA, Gawad AL, Karlen N, Singh A, Ford DE, Jabs DA, Appel LJ, Shade DM, Ehrhardt S, Baksh SN, Laeyendecker O, Pekosz A, Klein SL, Casadevall A, Tobian AAR, Hanley DF. Early Outpatient Treatment for Covid-19 with Convalescent Plasma. N Engl J Med. 2022 May 5;386(18):1700-1711. PMID: 35353960;
20. Pilla SJ, Yeh HC, Mitchell CM, Miller ER 3rd, Oh S, White K, Durkin N, Stein AA, Charleston JB, Lu M, Hu X, Wu B, Selvin E, Fang M, Maruthur NM, Juraschek SP, Mueller NT, Wang NY, Appel LJ; DASH4D Collaborative Research Group. Dietary Patterns, Sodium Reduction, and Blood Pressure in Type 2 Diabetes: The DASH4D Randomized Clinical Trial. JAMA Intern Med. 2025 Aug 1;185(8):937-946. PMID: 40489102.
