= Princess Mathilde Caroline of Bavaria =

Mathilde Caroline
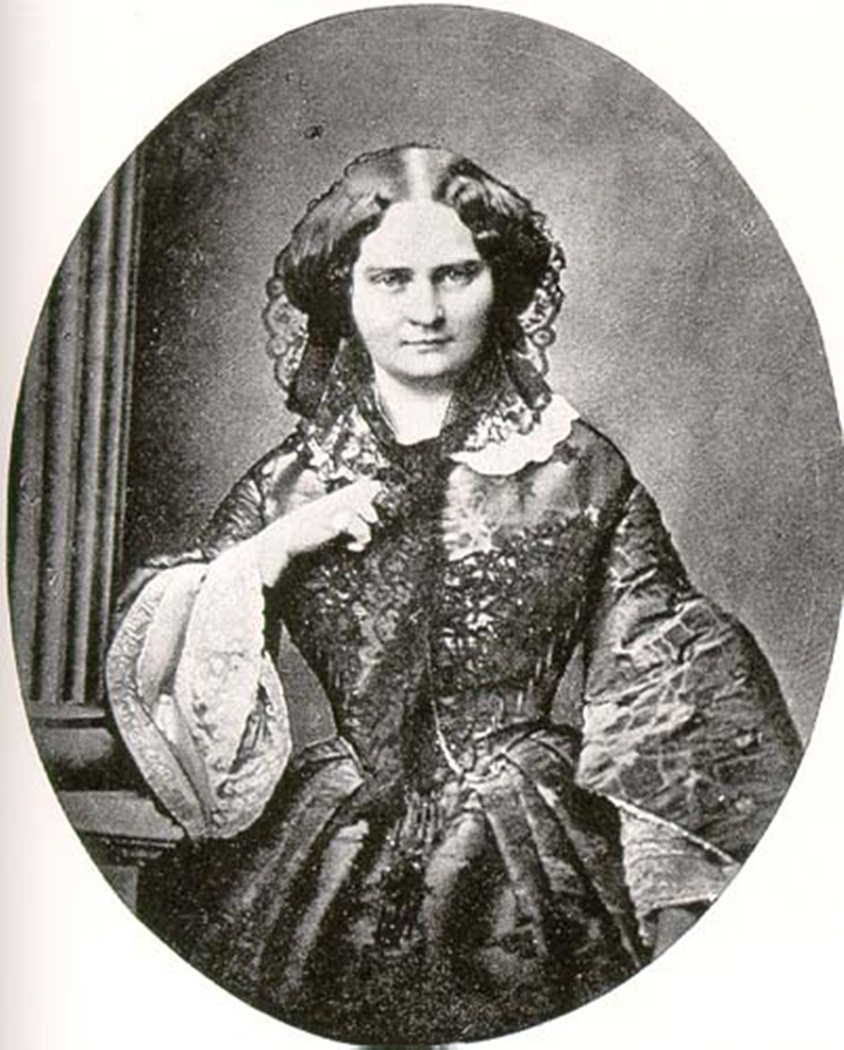
- Photograph by Franz Backofen, c. 1860

Grand Duchess consort of Hesse and by Rhine
- Tenure: 5 March 1848 – 25 May 1862
- Born: 30 August 1813; Augsburg, Kingdom of Bavaria, Confederation of the Rhine
- Died: 25 May 1862 (aged 48); Darmstadt, Grand Duchy of Hesse and by Rhine, German Confederation
- Spouse: Louis III, Grand Duke of Hesse (m. 1833)
- House: Wittelsbach
- Father: Ludwig I of Bavaria
- Mother: Therese of Saxe-Hildburghausen

Princess Mathilde Caroline of Bavaria (German: Mathilde Karoline Friederike Wilhelmine Charlotte von Bayern; 30 August 1813 – 25 May 1862) was the second child and eldest daughter of Ludwig I of Bavaria and Therese of Saxe-Hildburghausen.

== Life ==
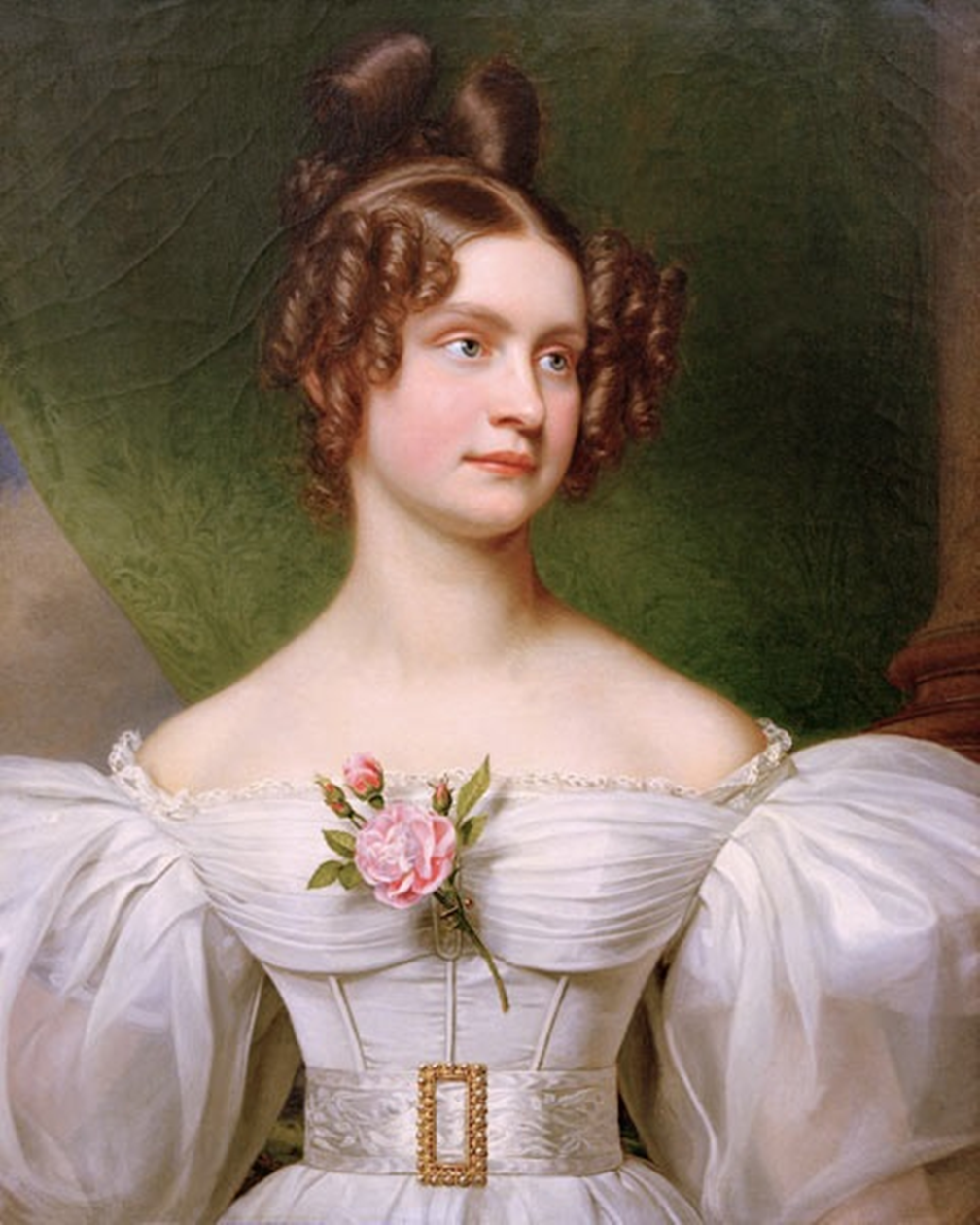
Portrait by Joseph Karl Stieler, 1830

Mathilde Caroline was the daughter of Ludwig I, King of Bavaria and Therese of Saxe-Hildburghausen. Mathilde descended multiple times over from the House of Hesse-Darmstadt.

On 26 December 1833 in Munich, Mathilde married Louis of Hesse, eldest son and heir of Louis II, Grand Duke of Hesse and Wilhelmine of Baden.

The couple moved to Dusseldorf in early 1834. They had no children.

== Honours ==
- Spain: Dame of the Order of Queen Maria Luisa

Princess Mathilde Caroline of Bavaria House of Wittelsbach Born: 30 August 1813 Died: 25 May 1862
German royalty
Vacant Title last held by Wilhelmine of Baden	Grand Duchess of Hesse and by Rhine; 16 June 1848 – 25 May 1862	Vacant Title next held by Alice of the United Kingdom
