= Empress Casino Joliet Corp. v. Giannoulias =

- Court: Supreme Court of Illinois
- Full case name: Empress Casino Joliet Corp. v. Giannoulias
- Decided: June 5, 2008
- Citations: 231 Ill.2d 62; 896 N.E.2d 277

Case history
- Subsequent actions: Cert. denied, 556 U.S. 1281 (2009).

Court membership
- Judges sitting: Charles E. Freeman; Robert R. Thomas; Thomas R. Fitzgerald; Thomas L. Kilbride; Rita B. Garman; Lloyd A. Karmeier; Anne M. Burke

Case opinions
- Decision by: Burke

Laws applied
- U.S. Const. amend. V; Ill. Const. art. VIII, § 1

Empress Casino Joliet Corporation v. Giannoulias, 231 Ill.2d 62, 896 N.E.2d 277 (2008), is a case from Supreme Court of Illinois in which four casinos challenged a tax imposed by Public Act 94-804. The Act was challenged on the grounds that it was an unconstitutional taking. The Court held categorically that a tax could never be a taking within the meaning of the Fifth Amendment to the Constitution.

== Parties ==
=== Plaintiffs ===
Argosy Empress Casino; Harrah's Casino Cruises Joliet; Hollywood Casino-Aurora; and Elgin Riverboat Resort-Riverboat Casino

=== Defendant ===
Alexi Giannoulias, Treasurer of the State of Illinois

== Facts of the case ==
Riverboat casinos were authorized in Illinois in 1990 under the Riverboat Gambling Act. Currently, there are nine riverboat casinos licensed and operating. There are five horse racing tracks in Illinois that are in no way tied to the casino industry, meaning they are in “pure” competition. The on-track betting at the tracks has declined over the past fifteen years and the riverboat casinos are largely blamed for the decline.

=== The Act ===
In response to the decline of the horse racing industry, the Illinois Legislature passed the Act in 2006. Major findings were that riverboat gaming has had a negative impact on horse racing. From 1992, the first full year of riverboat operations, through 2005, Illinois on-track wagering has decreased by 42% from $835 million to $482 million. Further, the Act found that the decrease in wagering had had a negative effect on the purses at the tracks, as well as on the state's breeding industry, which could be remedied by requiring that the riverboat casinos contribute a portion of their revenues to the competition. The Act specifically requires that any casino with adjusted gross receipts of over $200 million in 2004 must pay daily 3% of their adjusted gross receipts into the Horse Racing Equity Trust Fund. Distribution of the Fund would then be made to the horse racing tracks to be spent as follows: 60% for purses; and 40% for track improvement, maintenance and to otherwise operate the facility. The Illinois Racing Board would monitor how the funds are distributed, but not how the tracks actually spend the money. In essence, the track operators would have complete discretion on at least 40% of the money. The Act's payment obligation was to cease in May 2008; however in November 2008, the Legislature extended the payments for an additional three years.

The plaintiffs are the four riverboat casino operators that had adjusted gross receipts over $200 million in 2004. The four casinos are all in the Chicago area and enjoy higher adjusted gross receipts than casinos in other parts of the state due to the tourism draw of Chicago in general.

The casinos filed suit in state court four days after the Act went into effect, challenging the Act's constitutionality.

== Procedural history ==
In 2007, the Circuit Court in Illinois found that the Act was unconstitutional because it violated the uniformity clause of the Illinois Constitution. The court found there was no real difference between the four casinos taxed and the five not taxed and that no reasonable relationship had been provided for the classification. The court enjoined the Act's enforcement, which was later stayed pending resolution of the dispute.

The defendant appealed directly to the Supreme Court of Illinois, challenging the state court's ruling.

== Arguments in the Supreme Court of Illinois ==
=== Casinos' arguments ===
==== Takings argument ====
The casinos argued that a taking has occurred because the fees exacted by the Act primarily benefited private parties, rather than the public good. Whether the exaction is viewed as surcharge, a fee, or a tax, it is unconstitutional because it is being used for a private interest. Relying on language in Kelo v. City of New London, the casinos argue that “the sovereign may not take the property of A for the sole purpose of transferring it to another private party B, even though A is paid just compensation.” Moreover, the State would not be allowed to take private “land for the purpose of conferring a private benefit on a particular private party… Nor would the [State] by allowed to take property under the mere pretext of a public purpose, when its actual purpose was to bestow a private benefit.” The casinos’ argument is that money is a private property interest and should not be treated differently than personal or real property for a takings analysis when it is taken and given to a private party.

==== Uniformity Clause argument ====
Further, the casinos argued that the Act violated the Uniformity Clause of the Illinois Constitution. This Clause essentially states that whenever a law is passed that classifies the subjects or objects of non-property taxes or fees, the classifications must be reasonable and the classes must be taxed uniformly. Any classification must be based on a “real and substantial difference between the people taxed and those not taxed” and bear “some reasonable relationship to the object of the legislation or to public policy.” Casinos stated that the Act singled out riverboat casinos as the only class of businesses that are required to pay a tax to support the racetrack. Thus, it creates two classes of casinos: ones with adjusted gross receipts over $200 million; and those without adjusted gross receipts over $200 million. When pressed for an explanation as to why the tax was imposed only on those casinos with the receipts over $200 million, the Legislature stated that those casinos with AGR over $200 million were in the best position to bear the added expense of the tax. However, the “ability to pay” rationale does not provide a permissible justification for imposing the tax on only some of the casinos.

=== State of Illinois' arguments ===
The State focused their argument on the uniformity clause. Their argument was that the Act did not violate the clause because they merely have to articulate a justification for a classification of the taxation system. First, they stated that riverboat casinos and racetracks are two segments of the same industry. Second, the General Assembly asserted its justification for the tax on the riverboat segment alone because there was statistical evidence that the opening of riverboat casinos had caused a decline in on-track wagering and a decline in the horse breeding industry. Moreover, the taxation was imposed only on those casinos with adjusted gross receipts over $200 million because those casinos are best suited to absorb the cost of the taxation. The Supreme Court of Illinois had “long recognized that a taxpayer’s ability to absorb the costs of taxation is a legitimate basis for classification.” Thus, the Act did not violate the uniformity clause.

In their reply brief, the State further argued that the Act was not otherwise unconstitutional. It does not violate article VIII, section 1(a) of the Illinois Constitution, which states that any public funds must be used only for public purposes. The public purpose put forth by the State is the attempt to maintain the viability of horse racing in Illinois. Horse racing not only provides revenue for the State and a legal outlet for gamblers, but it is also creates many jobs to keep Illinoisans employed.

Challenging the takings claims, the State asserts that the casinos did not actually present a takings clause analysis. Even if casinos had properly presented a claim, the Takings Clause does not apply because it only applies when a tax is so oppressive or arbitrary as to be a confiscation of property. The casinos presented no evidence that it was arbitrary or oppressive and thus have not met their burden of clearly demonstrating a violation of the takings clause.

== Supreme Court of Illinois' holding ==
The Supreme Court of Illinois reversed the Circuit Court, finding that the Act did not violate the Uniformity Clause of the Illinois Constitution, nor did it violate any federal Constitution provisions.

=== The Uniformity Clause ===
First, the justices found that the tax classification system that taxed only riverboat casinos with adjusted gross receipts over $200 million was not arbitrary or unreasonable. The Court stated that it had never held that, in order to bear a reasonable relationship to the object of the legislation, the tax must be designed to remedy some burden the taxed class imposed on the state. Rather, this was one factor to be considered when determining reasonableness, and thus there was no support for the casinos’ claim that the Act violates the uniformity clause unless it was designed to remedy a special burden on the state. Further, the court stated it had repeatedly held that a tax may be imposed upon a class even though the class enjoys no benefit from the tax. The court agreed with the State that the objective of the Act, reversing the decline in horse racing in Illinois, bore a reasonable relationship between the classification and the object of the legislation.

==== The Takings Clause ====
Turning to the casinos’ takings claim, the court found that the takings clause did not apply because generally, a tax could never be found to be a taking. Firstly, the court finds that the power of the State to tax and the power of eminent domain are separate constitutional powers. Thus, the takings clause is not a limitation on the taxing power of the Legislature. The casinos’ attempt at distinguishing the tax in this case by calling it a fee, fails on the same principle: a takings analysis cannot apply to fees exacted because the exaction of fees falls under the power to raise revenue for public purposes. Because the just compensation portion of the takings clause only applies to the exercise of eminent domain, it cannot be held to apply to a completely separate power under the Constitution.

Further, the Court held that the Act served a public use or public purpose. “If the purpose sought to be achieved by the legislation is a public one and it contains elements of public benefit, then the question of how much benefit the public derives is for the legislature, not the courts.” The Court found that the principal purpose of the Act was to stimulate economic activity at the racetracks, including the creation of jobs and the attraction of sports and entertainment. Moreover, the emphasis of the Act was to benefit the entire horse racing industry, not the individual track owners. Even though the owners will obviously benefit from the increased economic activity at the tracks, it is an indirect benefit. The ultimate result of the infusion of funds will increase the horse racing activity, which in turn stimulates the horse breeding and agricultural industries in the state.

Lastly, the court found that a takings analysis would not be appropriate in any case because the “thing” taken was not physical or intellectual property, rather it was money. Relying on the dissent in Eastern Enterprises v. Apfel, the court noted that the private property upon which the clause traditionally has focused is a specific interest in physical or intellectual property. In Northern Illinois Home Builders Ass’n v. County of Du Page, cited by the casinos, the Supreme Court of Illinois applied a takings analysis to fees levied on new home builders was inextricably tied to real property. The court distinguished this case law by stating that the tax in this case did not involve physical property because the casinos were not land based, but rather riverboat casinos. Thus, the money exacted through the tax was not intertwined to real property and nothing physical was taking within the meaning of the federal Constitution. Therefore, a takings analysis would not apply.

== Subsequent history ==
The casinos filed a petition for a Writ of Certiorari with the Supreme Court of the United States on January 29, 2009. The Question Presented was whether the State's taking of money from private parties is wholly outside the scope of the Takings Clause.

Several amici curiae briefs have been filed with the court: the Cato Institute; the Chamber of Commerce of the United States of America; the National Taxpayers Union; the Mountain States Legal Foundation; the American Legislative Exchange Council (ALEC); the Illinois Alliance for Growth, Americans for Tax Reform; and a brief written by six law professors.

On June 8, 2009 the Petition was denied.

== Sources ==
- Supreme Court of the United States Docket for Empress
- Petition for a Writ of Certiorari
- Brief of the Plaintiffs-Appellees (casinos) in the Supreme Court of Illinois
- Brief of the Defendants-Appellants (State) in the Supreme Court of Illinois
