= Kevin Appel =

American artist (born 1967)

- Born: 1967 (age 58–59); Los Angeles, California
- Occupation: Artist

Kevin Appel (born 1967) is an American artist based in Los Angeles.

== Life and work ==
Appel was born in Los Angeles. He received his BFA from Parsons School of Design, New York City in 1990 and his MFA from the University of California in 1995. He is a Professor and Associate Chair of Graduate Studies at the University of California Irvine.

Appel's artwork relates to both abstract painting and architecture. It describes the slow and messy breakdown of the house and home and the psychological effects of that. Appel's abstract painted surfaces include approximations of architectural surfaces, and pure paint. His current paintings are large abstractions painted on large scale printed photographs.

== Catalogues ==
- Descripcion sin lugar: Una seleccion de obras de Kevin Appel, Museo Rufino Tamayo (Tobias Ostrander, Elizabeth Smith, ed.);
- Drawing Now: Eight Propositions, Museum of Modern Art (Laura Hoptman, ed.)
- Trespassing: Houses x Artists, Hatje Cantz (Alan Koch, et al., ed.)
- 01.01.01: Art in Technological Times, San Francisco Museum of Modern Art, San Francisco (David A Ross, et al., ed.)
- Painting at the Edge of the World, Walker Art Center (Douglas Fogle, ed.)
- Kevin Appel, Museum of Contemporary Art, Los Angeles (Jeremy Strick, Paul Schimmel, Jan Tumlir, ed.)
