= Philipp Schupp =

American handball player (1911-1991)

Personal information
- Full name: Philipp Heinrich Schupp
- Nationality: Germany; United States
- Born: August 11, 1911 Großsachsen, Germany
- Died: May 10, 1991 (aged 79) Southbury, United States

Sport
- Sport: Handball

Senior clubs
- Years: Team
- ?-?: TVG Großsachsen
- ?-?: German Sport Club Brooklyn
National team
Years	Team	Apps	(Gls)
?-?	United States	?	(?)

Philipp Heinrich Schupp (11 August 1911 – 10 May 1991) was an American male handball player. He was a member of the United States men's national handball team. He was a part of the team at the 1936 Summer Olympics, playing no games.

== Playing career ==
Around 1928 he played for TVG Großsachsen. Later he migrated to New York City and played for the German Sport Club Brooklyn. He was part of the 1936 Summer Olympics handball team of the United States. He was the sole player of the roster with none appearance at the Olympics.

== Family ==
He was the son of Heinrich Schupp and Elisabetha née Schumacher. He married Gertrude Stuss 1937 in New York. They had two children Philipp P. and Rudolf P. (Rudy) together.
