= Peter H. Appel =

American politician

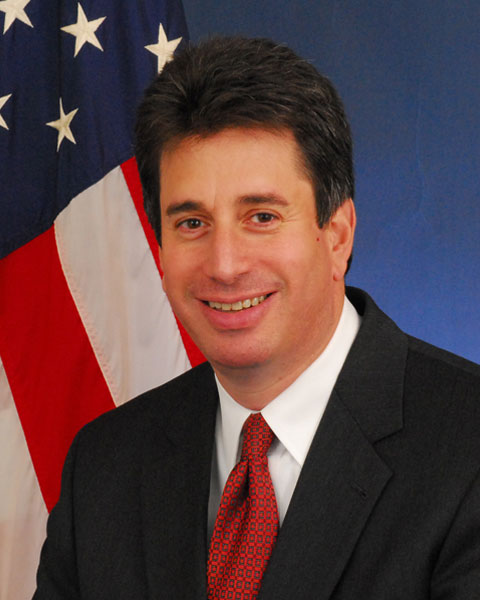
- Appel in 2009

Administrator of the Research and Innovative Technology Administration
- In office 2009–2011
- Appointed by: Barack Obama

Personal details
- Born: 1964 (age 61–62) United States
- Parent: Kenneth Appel (father)
- Relatives: Andrew Appel (brother)
- Education: London School of Economics; Massachusetts Institute of Technology; Brandeis University
- Occupation: Management consultant, Government official

Peter H. Appel (born 1964) was the administrator of the Research and Innovative Technology Administration (RITA). From 2009 to 2011 Appel was the Obama administration point person on transportation technology issues and research. He left RITA in late 2011 for the private sector to work on emerging technologies in the transportation industry.

== Early life ==
Mr. Appel has a Bachelor of Science degree in economics and computer science from Brandeis University and a Master of Science degree in transportation from the Massachusetts Institute of Technology.

== Career ==
Appel worked for the global management consulting firm of A.T. Kearney, Inc., where he led business improvement initiatives for clients in the private and public sectors, with a focus on Transportation and Infrastructure. Mr. Appel has worked in the transportation field since the late 1980s, and has supported organizations in the railroad, trucking, airline, and ocean shipping industries with growth strategy, supply chain improvement, post-merger integration, public-private partnerships, and other key business and policy issues. Previously, he served as the Special Assistant to the Administrator of the Federal Aviation Administration, and as Assistant Director for Pricing and Yield Management at Amtrak.

He was confirmed by the U.S. Senate as Administrator of the Research and Innovative Technology Administration (RITA) on April 29, 2009. During his tenure at RITA, Appel worked with Secretary Ray LaHood to advance key U.S. Department of Transportation (USDOT) initiatives by leveraging effective research and cross-modal coordination. These initiatives have included the Distracted Driving Summit, which brought key transportation researchers, advocates, decision makers and other leaders together to address this growing safety issue; the bolstering of USDOT Intelligent Transportation Systems (ITS) Program to best improve safety, efficiency, and environmental sustainability across all modes of surface transportation; and the establishment of the Department's Safety Council. Appel coordinated DOT's research programs associated with railroads, aviation, maritime transportation and vehicles. As administrator of RITA, he also coordinated DOT efforts on distracted driving and research gathering statistical data about the various transportation modes.
