= Julio César Schupp =

Paraguayan diplomat

Julio César Schupp Rodríguez (21 July 1935 – 21 February 2005 in Asunción) was a Paraguayan diplomat.

He was Executive Secretary of LAFTA and afterwards Secretary-General of ALADI (1980–1984).

Rodriguez also served as Paraguayan Ambassador to Uruguay.

== Personal life ==
Married to Lucy Montanaro, Miss Paraguay 1957. They had three children: Marcelo, María Stefania, and Álvaro María.
