= Research and Innovative Technology Administration =

Research programs agency within the U.S. Department of Transportation

Agency overview
- Formed: February 22, 2005
- Dissolved: 2015
- Jurisdiction: United States government
- Headquarters: Washington, D.C.
- Agency executive: Gregory D. Winfree, Administrator (acting)
- Parent agency: U.S. Department of Transportation
- Website: Research and Innovative Technology Administration Website

The Research and Innovative Technology Administration (RITA) was a unit of the United States Department of Transportation (USDOT). It was created in 2005 to advance transportation science, technology, and analysis, as well as improve the coordination of transportation research within the department and throughout the transportation community.

RITA performed four basic functions:

1. Coordinated the USDOT's research and education programs
2. Shared advanced technologies with the transportation system
3. Offered transportation statistics and analysis for decision-making
4. Supported national efforts to improve education and training in transportation-related fields

RITA had over 750 employees in Washington, DC, at the Volpe Center (Cambridge, Massachusetts), and at the Transportation Safety Institute (Oklahoma City, OK).

RITA was dissolved by section 6012 of the Fixing America's Surface Transportation (FAST) Act of 2015 and its functions were transferred to the Assistant Secretary for Research and Technology.

== History ==
RITA was created under the Norman Y. Mineta Research and Special Program Improvement Act, and opened its doors on February 22, 2005. RITA's formation was part of a Department-wide reorganization to create one agency solely focused on promoting transportation research. In a report titled Research Activities of the Department of Transportation: A Report to Congress, then-Transportation Secretary Mineta promoted his vision for RITA as “A DOT administration that combines research-driven innovation and entrepreneurship to ensure a safe and robust transportation network.”

The new agency was formed from several existing parts of USDOT:

- The Bureau of Transportation Statistics (BTS), which was formed in 1992 after being authorized in the Intermodal Surface Transportation Efficiency Act of 1991 (ISTEA). BTS was previously an independent statistical agency within DOT.
- The Office of Research, Development and Technology, which was part of the former Research and Special Programs Administration (RSPA), an agency that was disestablished by the Mineta Act;
- The Office of Inter modalism which was created by the ISTEA and was formerly part of the Office of the Secretary in DOT;
- The John A. Volpe National Transportation Systems Center in Cambridge, Massachusetts, which was formed in 1970 to provide analytical, scientific, and engineering support to the newly established USDOT. The center had been part of RSPA.
- The Transportation Safety Institute (TSI), established in 1971 to assist DOT modal administrations in accomplishing their mission-essential training requirements. TSI had been part of RSPA.
- The Intelligent Transportation Systems (ITS) Joint Program Office (JPO), which is composed of program managers and coordinators of the USDOT's multimodal Intelligent Transportation Systems research initiatives. Created in 1991, the JPO was previously part of the Federal Highway Administration.

== Organization ==
RITA was led by two presidential appointees. Within RITA there were several program offices, which reported directly to the Administrator. Those offices were:

=== Office of Research, Development and Technology (RD&T) ===
RITA's Research, Development, and Technology (RD&T) office's mission was to coordinate research across all modes of transportation and to promote advanced innovative transportation solutions. RD&T coordinated a research planning council, a planning team, and several research clusters that were dedicated to certain multimodal research subjects. The planning council ensured cross modal collaboration and coordination in research being done with DOT and its partners, and advised the Secretary of Transportation on research issues. The planning team supported the council by reviewing and coordinating departmental research plans and budgets, assessing research, and promoting best practices in research performance and technology transfer.

==== University Transportation Centers (UTC) ====
The University Transportation Centers Program funded transportation research at 136 colleges and universities and helps advance the education and training needed to support a 21st Century transportation system. Research and education programs provided by UTCs address critical national transportation challenges while developing the next generation of transportation professionals. UTC colleges and universities trained 32,000 practicing transportation professionals in 2009.

==== Climate Change Center ====
The virtual DOT Center for Climate Change and Environmental Forecasting, an online, interactive knowledge base on transportation and climate change, included information on greenhouse gas emissions, the potential impacts of climate change on the infrastructure, approaches for integrating climate change considerations into transportation decision making, and ideas for adaptation and mitigation.

==== Remote Sensing and Spatial Information Technologies Program ====
This program developed and validated remote sensing technologies for application to transportation infrastructure in the three major areas listed below. Congress authorized approximately $7 million a year for this work.

- Cost and time reduction for corridor planning and collecting information for environmental assessment,
- Freight congestion management at ports, border crossings and gateways, and in urban areas, and
- Paved and unpaved roads and bridge systems management and condition assessment.

=== Bureau of Transportation Statistics (BTS) ===
Established as a policy-neutral statistical agency in 1992, the Bureau of Transportation Statistics (BTS) provides comprehensive data about America's transportation networks. The data reveals how people, goods, and vehicles move through the system, as well as measure the impact of social, economic, and environmental factors on system performance. BTS is the source of much of the nation's data on the operations and finances of commercial airlines. BTS also conducts the Commodity Flow Survey, the only nationwide intermodal freight data source.

As a federal statistical agency, BTS releases data based on a published schedule. BTS issues monthly press releases on the Freight Transportation Services Index, airline traffic, scheduled passenger airline employment and North American surface freight. Quarterly releases are issued on average domestic air fares and airline financials, including baggage fees and reservation change fees. BTS is the source of available statistics on airline on-time data and tarmac data. BTS’ tarmac data was widely used in deliberations on the issue of lengthy tarmac times, which has been well-publicized in the last three years. BTS’ data is the key indicator of the effectiveness of the federal rule implementing a three-hour time limit on planes sitting on the tarmac. The rule went into effect April 29, 2010.

Annually in the month of May, BTS issues an annual press release on airline employment by job category, with totals for pilots, maintenance workers and outsourcing of maintenance. In November, BTS issues an annual press release on the update of the North American Transportation Statistics Database, a project conducted jointly with Canada, Mexico, and the U.S. Census Bureau.

==== National Transportation Library (NTL) ====
Established in 1998, the National Transportation Library is a part of the Bureau of Transportation Statistics that maintains and facilitates access to statistical and other information needed for transportation decision-making at the Federal, state, and local levels. It also coordinates with public and private transportation libraries and information providers to improve information sharing among the transportation community. The NTL's reference staff assists US DOT staff and the general public in locating transportation-related documents and reports, statistics, and subject experts at DOT. Reference staff is available from 8:00a.m to 5:00 p.m. EST to answer telephone calls and emails, or reference requests can be submitted at any time via the web through Ask-A-Librarian.

=== Intelligent Transportation Systems Joint Program Office (ITS JPO) ===
Intelligent Transportation Systems Joint Program Office (ITS JPO) focuses on intelligent vehicles, intelligent infrastructure and the creation of an intelligent transportation system involving these two components to enhance surface transportation safety and mobility and contribute to America's economic growth. The Federal ITS program supports the overall advancement of ITS through investments in major initiatives, exploratory studies and a deployment support program. Increasingly, the Federal investments are directed at targets of opportunity – major initiatives – that have the potential for significant payoff in improving safety, mobility and productivity. The ITS Program places priority on research in intelligent vehicles, intelligent infrastructure and the development of a nationwide transportation system. The ITS Program supports major investments in technology initiatives, exploratory research, and deployment support activities designed to help state and local jurisdictions optimize technology deployments.

Connected vehicle research is the ITS Joint Program Office's leading initiative. Connected Vehicle Technology is fundamentally about wireless communications between vehicles and other vehicles as well as between vehicles and the surrounding infrastructure such as traffic signals, work zones and grade crossings. In each case the communication involves devices that are either embedded in, or brought into, the vehicle or infrastructure. The wireless communication uses Dedicated Short Range Communications (DSRC), a technology similar to WiFi, which supports applications designed to prevent crashes, increase mobility and improve the environment.

=== Positioning, Navigation, and Timing (PNT) ===
The Positioning, Navigation, and Timing (PNT) program is responsible for coordinating and developing PNT technology, PNT policy, and spectrum management. These responsibilities previously were performed by Office of the Secretary and were delegated to RITA by the Secretary of Transportation in August 2007. All modes of transportation rely on the Global Positioning System (GPS) and other PNT capabilities to provide safe and reliable operation of transportation systems. PNT is crucial for planning and tracking shipments, mapping routes, and other transportation functions, and is increasingly used for safety functions. The Office of Positioning, Navigation, and Timing represents all Federal civil departments and agencies in the development, acquisition, management, and operations of GPS, as well as providing civil PNT system analysis including requirements and architecture development and performance monitoring.

RITA serves as the coordinator for the inland component of the Nationwide Differential GPS System (NDGPS), an augmentation to GPS which provides increased accuracy and integrity signals to surface transportation applications of GPS. The NDGPS signal is also used by many other civil economic sectors.

=== John A. Volpe National Transportation Systems Center ===
The John A. Volpe National Transportation Systems Center in Cambridge, Massachusetts, partners with organizations across government and the private sector to research and develop solutions to emerging transportation issues. The Volpe Center is funded through a fee-for-service structure, which means all costs are covered by sponsored project work.

The Volpe Center was established in 1970 to provide analytical, scientific, and engineering support to the newly established U.S. Department of Transportation. From the beginning, the center was envisioned as a place where a broad range of skills could be focused on major issues that cut across the traditional modal structure of the transportation enterprise.

Housed on the campus of NASA's former Electronics Research Center, the Center opened as the Transportation Systems Center thanks to growing congressional awareness of the need to apply advanced technology to national transportation problems and the efforts of then-U.S. Secretary of Transportation John A. Volpe, as well as those of the Massachusetts congressional delegation. In 1990, the center was renamed in John A. Volpe's honor.

=== Transportation Safety Institute (TSI) ===
Located in Oklahoma City, Oklahoma, the Transportation Safety Institute (TSI) conducts worldwide safety, security, and environmental training for public and private sector transportation professionals. TSI offers more than 700 courses and seminars designed to prepare safety professionals to handle emergencies and other critical incidents through a hands-on, real-world training experience, such as using staged debris fields for aircraft crash investigation training. TSI funding comes through a fee-for-service structure, which means all costs are covered by sponsored project work.

== RITA Activities ==
=== Distracted Driving Summit ===
The first Distracted Driving Summit was held in 2009 in Washington, D.C., with the second annual Summit held on September 21, 2010, in Washington. The Summit aims to raise awareness about the dangers of distracted driving and also to examine emerging technology, policy, and other innovations to curb distracted driving in the United States.

=== U.S. Department of Transportation Safety Council ===
In October 2010, Secretary of Transportation Ray LaHood convened the first meeting of the U.S. DOT Safety Council, formed to tackle critical transportation safety issues facing the Department's 10 operating administrations. Before taking office, LaHood noticed that the department's agencies were pursuing many important safety initiatives without a formal process for sharing data, best practices, and strategies. He established the Safety Council to serve a cross-modal safety leadership role, enabling an even stronger safety culture in the department, and designated RITA to coordinate council activities. The goals of the Safety Council are to further enhance the safety focus throughout all of the department's agencies and to improve the impact of the department's safety programs. Transportation Deputy Secretary John Porcari chairs the council, which comprises the heads of the Department's 10 agencies. The council will be action-oriented and data-driven, emphasizing open dialogue about common issues and providing a forum for fresh ideas and different perspectives.

=== RITA Publications ===
RITA publishes several different annual statistical reports as well as weekly, monthly, quarterly, and annual press releases and updates regarding transportation statistics which reflect what is going on in the world of transportation in addition to the larger U.S. economy. All of RITA's publications can be found on RITA's website. One important RITA publication is the Transportation Statistics Annual Report (TSAR), which includes data on all modes of transportation. The most recent TSAR can be found on RITA's website.

== Role within Department of Transportation ==
RITA was one of ten Operating Administrations within the U.S. Department of Transportation. The others are:

- Federal Aviation Administration (FAA)
- Federal Highway Administration (FHWA)
- Federal Motor Carrier Safety Administration (FMCSA)
- Federal Railroad Administration (FRA)
- Federal Transit Administration (FTA)
- Great Lakes St. Lawrence Seaway Development Corporation (GLS)
- Maritime Administration (MARAD)
- National Highway Traffic Safety Administration (NHTSA)
- Pipeline and Hazardous Materials Safety Administration (PHMSA)

RITA worked with these different modal administrations to coordinate communication of research performed in the different modes, promoting synergy across the modes of transportation.
