= Valdir Appel =

Brazilian footballer

Personal information
- Full name: Valdir Appel
- Date of birth: 1 May 1946 (age 80)
- Place of birth: Brusque, Brazil
- Position: Goalkeeper

Youth career
- Paysandu-SC

Senior career*
Years	Team	Apps	(Gls)
1963–1965	Paysandu-SC		
1965	→ Carlos Renaux (loan)		
1965	→ America-RJ (loan)		
1966–1972	Vasco da Gama		
1970	→ Sport Recife (loan)		
1972	Carlos Renaux		
1973	Blumenau		
1973	Campo Grande-RJ		
1973–1974	CEUB		
1974	Sport Recife		
1974	Alecrim		
1975	Campo Grande-RJ		
1975–1976	América-RN		
1976	Volta Redonda		
1977	Bonsucesso		
1977–1978	América-RN		
1978	Alecrim		
1978–1980	Goiânia		
1979	→ CEUB (loan)		
1980–1981	Atlético Goianiense		
1981–1982	Goiânia		
1982	Rio Verde-GO		
- * Club domestic league appearances and goals as of 25 February 2024

Valdir Appel (born 1 May 1946), is a Brazilian former professional footballer who played as a goalkeeper.

== Career ==
Born in Brusque, Appel began his career at CE Paysandu, also having a spell at CA Carlos Renaux, until arriving in Rio de Janeiro on loan to America. In 1966, it was definitively acquired by Vasco da Gama. At Vasco, he was a substitute for Edgardo Andrada most of the time, including during Pelé's 1000th goal. He was notable for throwing the ball into his own goal in a match against Bangu on 16 March 1969. Appel played for several clubs throughout Brazil, ending his career at EC Rio Verde in 1982.

== Honours ==
Vasco da Gama

- Campeonato Carioca: 1970

Rio Verde

- Campeonato Goiano Second Division: 1982

== Post career ==
Valdir Appel became a writer of books with an emphasis on football.

#	Date	Title	Ref.
1	2006	Na boca do gol	
2	2010	O goleiro acorrentado	
3	2014	Onde ele pisa nascem histórias	
4	2018	Para sempre o mais querido: A história do Clube Esportivo Paysandú	
5	2019	Voltaço: O início de uma paixão!	
