= Andrew Appel =

American computer scientist

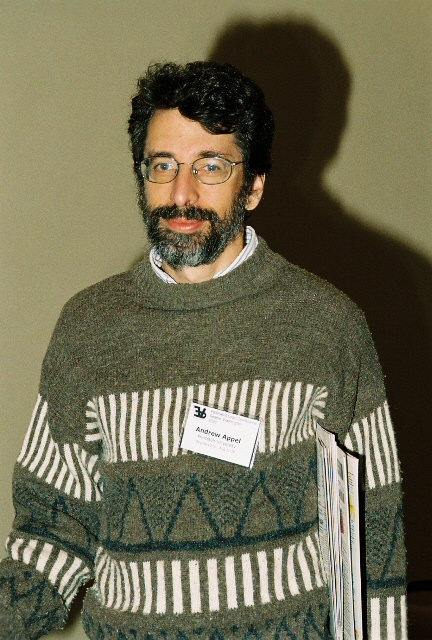
- Andrew Appel in 2006
- Born: 1960 (age 65–66)
- Father: Kenneth Appel
- Relatives: Peter H. Appel (brother)

Andrew Wilson Appel (born 1960) is the Eugene Higgins Professor of computer science at Princeton University. He is especially well known because of his compiler books, the Modern Compiler Implementation in ML (ISBN 0-521-58274-1) series, as well as Compiling With Continuations (ISBN 0-521-41695-7). He is also a major contributor to the Standard ML of New Jersey compiler, along with David MacQueen, John H. Reppy, Matthias Blume and others and one of the authors of Rog-O-Matic.

== Biography ==
Andrew Appel is the son of mathematician Kenneth Appel, who proved the Four-Color Theorem in 1976. Appel graduated summa cum laude with an A.B. in physics from Princeton University in 1981 after completing a senior thesis, titled "Investigation of galaxy clustering using an asymptotically fast N-body algorithm", under the supervision of Nobel laureate James Peebles. He later received a Ph.D. (computer science) at Carnegie Mellon University, in 1985. He became an ACM Fellow in 1998, due to his research of programming languages and compilers.

In 1981, Appel developed a better approach to the n-body problem in linearithmic instead of quadratic time.

From July 2005 to July 2006, he was a visiting researcher at the Institut national de recherche en informatique et en automatique (INRIA), Rocquencourt, France, on sabbatical from Princeton University.

Andrew Appel campaigns on issues related to the interaction of law and computer technology. He testified in the penalty phase of the Microsoft antitrust case in 2002. He is opposed to the introduction of some computerized voting machines, which he deemed untrustworthy. In 2007, he received attention when he purchased a number of voting machines for the purpose of investigating their security. In 2024, he testified as an expert on voting machines in federal court hearings that led to a preliminary injunction disallowing New Jersey's “county line” system that was alleged to provide an unfair advantage to candidates backed by county political party organizations.
