= Otto Appel =

German agriculturalist

Friedrich Carl Louis Otto Appel (19 May 1867 – 10 November 1952) was a German botanist and agriculturalist.

Appel was born in Coburg, Kingdom of Bavaria. Following work as an assistant at the Universities of Würzburg and Königsberg, he joined the newly established biological division of agriculture and forestry at the Imperial Health Office in Berlin (1899), from which the Biologische Bundesanstalt für Land- und Forstwirtschaft (Biological Reich Institute for Agriculture and Forestry) in Berlin-Dahlem later emerged. Here he served as its director from 1920 to 1933.

Appel was a leading authority on potato diseases. In Germany he developed a successful seed potato inspection program. He died in Berlin-Zehlendorf.

== Selected writings ==
- Die Pflanzkartoffel, 1918 - The seed potato.
- Taschenatlas der kartoffelkrankheiten, 1925–26 - Pocket atlas of potato diseases.
- "The diseases of sugar beet", 1927 (English ed. edited by R.N. Dowling).
- Taschenatlas der Krankheiten des Beeren- und Schalenobstes, 1929.
