= Global Financing Facility =

International development initiative

The Global Financing Facility is an international development initiative that is supported by the World Bank. It aims to fight poverty and inequity by advancing the health and rights of women and children.

It focuses on the continuum of care during pregnancy, birth, early years and adolescence, primarily women and children. As of 2018, it had worked in 27 countries. It brings together donors and the private sector especially to fund maternal health programmes.

== History ==
The Global Finance Facility was launched at the Financing for Development Conference in Addis Ababa in July 2015 by the United Nations and the World Bank as part of an effort to achieve goal three of the Sustainable Development Goals, Good health and well-being for people, and in particular to help governments in low- and lower-middle income countries transform how they prioritize and finance the health and nutrition of their people.

The Democratic Republic of the Congo, Ethiopia, Kenya and Tanzania were the first countries to benefit. It also now works in Afghanistan, Bangladesh, Burkina Faso, Cambodia, Cameroon, Central African Republic, Côte d’Ivoire, Guatemala, Guinea, Haiti, Indonesia, Liberia, Madagascar, Malawi, Mali, Mozambique, Myanmar, Nigeria, Rwanda, Senegal, Sierra Leone, Uganda and Vietnam.

It received a $200 million donation to its trust fund from the Bill & Melinda Gates Foundation in 2017 and was looking to raise $2 billion in 2018. In November 2018, ten new investors—Burkina Faso, Côte d'Ivoire, Denmark, the European Commission, Germany, Japan, Laerdal Global Health, the Netherlands, Qatar and an anonymous donor—joined the existing funders: the Gates Foundation, Canada, MSD for Mothers, Norway, and the United Kingdom.

In 2018, it was one of the sponsors of the Global Action Plan.

In June 2021 GFF formed a partnership with the Government of Mozambique to support the COVID-19 pandemic response and rollout of the vaccines.

== Links to organizations ==
GFF financing is linked to:

- Domestic government resources - reducing inefficiencies and raising taxes
- "Concessional" loans from the International Development Association and the International Bank of Reconstruction and Development
- Financing from donors - either new or existing
- Private sector assistance
