= David Appel (ice hockey) =

Czech ice hockey player

- Position: Forward
- Slovak Extraliga team: MHC Martin

David Appel is a Czech professional ice hockey player in Slovakia with MHC Martin of the Slovak Extraliga.
