= Resolve to Save Lives =

Nonprofit global health organization

Resolve to Save Lives (RTSL) is a nonprofit global health organization that works with partners worldwide to create solutions to deadly health threats. The organization focuses on epidemic prevention, blood pressure control, and healthier food, among other program areas. The organization employs professionals based in the U.S., India, Ethiopia, and Nigeria. Resolve to Save Lives is headed by president and CEO Dr. Tom Frieden, an infectious disease physician and public health expert and former director of the US Centers for Disease Control and Prevention (CDC).

== History ==
Launched in 2017 as a part of Vital Strategies, Resolve to Save Lives became an independent nonprofit organization in 2022. Initial funders of Resolve to Save Lives include Bloomberg Philanthropies, the Bill & Melinda Gates Foundation, and Gates Philanthropy Partners, which is funded with support from the Chan Zuckerberg Foundation.

== Program areas ==
=== Cardiovascular health ===
Since its inception in 2017, Resolve to Save Lives has partnered with communities, countries, and global organizations with the aim of preventing 100 million deaths from cardiovascular disease within 30 years.

==== Blood pressure control ====
RTSL’s partnerships with the World Health Organization (WHO), the World Heart Federation, the Pan American Health Organization, country governments, and additional stakeholders has provided countries with technical and operational support to implement sustainable programs and save lives from cardiovascular disease. RTSL’s partners have enrolled more than 30 million people in blood pressure control programs.

==== Healthier food ====
Resolve to Save Lives has partnered with WHO and others with the goal of reducing global salt intake by 30 percent by 2050 and eliminating artificial trans fat from the global food supply by 2030.

As of 2023, 53 countries, representing nearly 4 billion people, have implemented WHO-recommended best practices that include bans or limits on trans fat.

=== Epidemic prevention ===
RTSL was founded in the wake of the 2014-2016 Ebola outbreak in West Africa, an event that foreshadowed weaknesses in the world’s ability to prevent the next epidemic. Drawing inspiration from the successful control of Ebola in Lagos, Nigeria, Resolve to Save Lives assessed and partnered to improve epidemic readiness across several countries.

RTSL publishes reports on “Epidemics That Didn’t Happen.”

==== COVID-19 response ====
RTSL’s COVID-19 response supported more than 60 countries and trained 40,000 healthcare workers who care for over 122 million people worldwide. RTSL collaborated with The New York Times to develop a county-level COVID-19 risk assessment tracker, which provided which provided insights into the spread and severity of the virus across the United States.

RTSL co-led the Partnership for Evidence-Based Response to COVID-19 (PERC) - a public-private partnership that supported evidence-based measures to reduce the impact of COVID-19 on African Union Member States. PERC collected social, economic, epidemiologic, population movement and security data from over 20 African countries, providing insights on the effectiveness and public perception of evidence-based policy decisions.

RTSL also promoted a structured COVID-19 Risk Alert Level system, a tiered measure based on local transmission and capacity that can communicate changing risk levels clearly to inform and empower individuals and communities.

== 7-1-7 Alliance ==
In 2021, Resolve to Save Lives proposed the 7-1-7 target: the first real-time measure of how quickly health systems find and stop epidemic threats. Developed and refined with its partners in Brazil, Ethiopia, Liberia, Nigeria, and Uganda, the 7-1-7 target has been adopted by the WHO, the Pandemic Fund, the World Bank, and The Global Fund. In 2023, the 7-1-7 Alliance formed to accelerate the adoption and achievement of the target, which more than two dozen countries are using to improve how they respond to outbreaks.

== Recognition ==
2024 World Hypertension League Organizational Excellence Award.
