= Discharging method (discrete mathematics) =

Technique used to prove lemmas in structural graph theory

The discharging method is a technique used to prove lemmas in structural graph theory. Discharging is most well known for its central role in the proof of the four color theorem. The discharging method is used to prove that every graph in a certain class contains some subgraph from a specified list. The presence of the desired subgraph is then often used to prove a coloring result.

Most commonly, discharging is applied to planar graphs. Initially, a charge is assigned to each face and each vertex of the graph. The charges are assigned so that they sum to a small positive number. During the Discharging Phase the charge at each face or vertex may be redistributed to nearby faces and vertices, as required by a set of discharging rules. However, each discharging rule maintains the sum of the charges. The rules are designed so that after the discharging phase each face or vertex with positive charge lies in one of the desired subgraphs. Since the sum of the charges is positive, some face or vertex must have a positive charge.

A well-known example of the discharging method is in proofs of the four color theorem for planar graphs, where it was used to obtain certain "unavoidable configurations" whose existence prevents all planar graphs from being minimal counterexamples to the theorem. A very complicated and computer-based case analysis for this method, from the original proof by Kenneth Appel and Wolfgang Haken, was later simplified by Neil Robertson, Daniel P. Sanders, Paul Seymour, and Robin Thomas., but the simplified proof remains complex, with "many configurations and rules".

== An example ==
In 1904, Wernicke introduced the discharging method to prove the following theorem, which was part of an attempt to prove the four color theorem.

Theorem: If a planar graph has minimum degree 5, then it either has an edge with endpoints both of degree 5 or one with endpoints of degrees 5 and 6.

Proof: We use $V$, $F$, and $E$ to denote the sets of vertices, faces, and edges, respectively. We call an edge light if its endpoints are both of degree 5 or are of degrees 5 and 6. Embed the graph in the plane. To prove the theorem, it is sufficient to only consider planar triangulations (because, if it holds on a triangulation, when removing nodes to return to the original graph, neither node on either side of the desired edge can be removed without reducing the minimum degree of the graph below 5). We arbitrarily add edges to the graph until it is a triangulation. Since the original graph had minimum degree 5, each endpoint of a new edge has degree at least 6. So, none of the new edges are light. Thus, if the triangulation contains a light edge, then that edge must have been in the original graph.

We give the charge $6-d(v)$ to each vertex $v$ and the charge $6-2d(f)$ to each face $f$, where $d(x)$ denotes the degree of a vertex and the length of a face. (Since the graph is a triangulation, the charge on each face is 0.) Recall that the sum of all the degrees in the graph is equal to twice the number of edges; similarly, the sum of all the face lengths equals twice the number of edges. Using Euler's Formula, it's easy to see that the sum of all the charges is 12:

$$\begin{align}
\sum_{f\in F} 6-2d(f) + \sum_{v\in V} 6-d(v) =& \\
6|F| - 2(2|E|) + 6|V| - 2|E| =& \\
6(|F| - |E| + |V|) = &&12.
\end{align}$$

We use only a single discharging rule: Each degree 5 vertex gives a charge of 1/5 to each neighbor. The sum of charges does not change, and is therefore 12. Since the sum of charges of faces is 0, the sum of charges of vertices is 12, therefore there must exist some vertices with positive charge.

We consider which vertices could have positive final charge. The only vertices with positive initial charge are vertices of degree 5. Each degree 5 vertex gives a charge of 1/5 to each neighbor. So, each vertex is given a total charge of at most $d(v)/5$. The initial charge of each vertex v is $6-d(v)$. So, the final charge of each vertex is at most $6-4d(v)/5$. Hence, a vertex can only have positive final charge if it has degree at most 7. Now we show that each vertex with positive final charge is adjacent to an endpoint of a light edge.

If a vertex $v$ has degree 5 or 6 and has positive final charge, then $v$ received charge from an adjacent degree 5 vertex $u$, so edge $uv$ is light. If a vertex $v$ has degree 7 and has positive final charge, then $v$ received charge from at least 6 adjacent degree 5 vertices. Since the graph is a triangulation, the vertices adjacent to $v$ must form a cycle, and since it has only degree 7, the degree 5 neighbors cannot be all separated by vertices of higher degree; at least two of the degree 5 neighbors of $v$ must be adjacent to each other on this cycle. This yields the light edge.
