= Kempe chain =

Mathematical device used in proof of the four colour theorem

A graph containing a Kempe chain consisting of alternating blue and red vertices

In mathematics, a Kempe chain is a device used mainly in the study of the four colour theorem. Intuitively, it is a connected chain of vertices on a graph with alternating colours.

== History ==
Kempe chains were first used by Alfred Kempe in his attempted proof of the four colour theorem. Even though his proof turned out to be incomplete, the method of Kempe chains is crucial to the success of valid modern proofs, such as the first successful one by Kenneth Appel and Wolfgang Haken. Furthermore, the method is used in the proof of the five color theorem by Percy John Heawood, a weaker but more easily proven version of the four colour theorem.

== Formal definition ==
The term "Kempe chain" is used in two different but related ways.

Suppose G is a graph with vertex set V, with a given colouring function

$$c : V \to S,$$

where S is a finite set of colours, containing at least two distinct colours a and b. If v is a vertex with colour a, then the (a, b)-Kempe chain of G containing v is the maximal connected subset of V which contains v and whose vertices are all coloured either a or b.

The above definition is what Kempe worked with. Typically, the set S has four elements (the four colours of the four colour theorem), and c is a proper colouring, that is, each pair of adjacent vertices in V are assigned distinct colours. With these additional conditions, a and b are two out of the four colours available, and every element of the (a, b)-Kempe chain has neighbours in the chain of only the other colour.

A more general definition, which is used in the modern computer-based proofs of the four colour theorem, is the following. Suppose again that G is a graph, with edge set E, and this time we have a colouring function

$$c : E \to S.$$

If e is an edge assigned colour a, then the (a, b)-Kempe chain of G containing e is the maximal connected subset of E which contains e and whose edges are all coloured either a or b.

This second definition is typically applied where S has three elements, say a, b and c, and where V is a cubic graph, that is, every vertex has three incident edges. If such a graph is properly coloured, then each vertex must have edges of three distinct colours, and Kempe chains end up being paths, which is simpler than in the case of the first definition.

== Application to the four colour theorem ==
Planar graphs necessarily have a vertex of degree at most five. As such, to prove the four colour theorem, it is sufficient to prove that vertices of degree at most five are four-colourable. Kempe was able to prove the case of degree four and give a partial proof of degree five using Kempe chains.

In this case, Kempe chains are used to prove the idea that no vertex of degree four has to be touching four distinct colours different from itself. First, one can create a graph with a vertex v and four vertices as neighbours. If we remove the vertex v, we can four-colour the remaining vertices. We can set the colours as (in clockwise order) red, yellow, blue, and green. In this situation, there can be a Kempe chain joining the red and blue neighbours or a Kempe chain joining the green and yellow neighbours, but not both, since these two paths would necessarily intersect, and the vertex where they intersect cannot be coloured with both red or blue and with green or yellow at the same time. Supposing that the Kempe chain is connecting the green and yellow neighbours, red and blue must then necessarily not have a Kempe chain between them. So, when placing the original vertex v back into the graph, we can simply reverse the colours of the red vertex and its neighbours (including the red vertex, making it blue), which leaves vertex v with two blue neighbours, one green, and one yellow. This means v has only three distinct colours as neighbours, and that we can now colour vertex v as red. This results in a four-coloured graph.

== Other applications ==
Kempe chains have been used to solve problems in colouring extension. Kempe chains have also been used as neighborhood operators in local search algorithms for problems related to graph coloring, including timetabling and seating allocation.

== See also ==
- Four colour theorem
- Five colour theorem
- Graph colouring
