= Discharge =

Discharge may refer to:

- The act of firing a gun
- Termination of employment, the end of an employee's duration with an employer
- Military discharge, the release of a member of the armed forces from service

== Flow ==
- Discharge (hydrology), the amount of water flowing through the channel
  - Effluent released into a river or sea
  - Groundwater discharge, the volumetric flow rate of groundwater through an aquifer
- Discharging method (discrete mathematics) is a proof technique in discrete mathematics
- Electric discharge:
  - Corona discharge, a type of electric current
  - Glow discharge, a plasma
  - Discharger, an electrical device that releases stored energy
    - Battery discharging
    - Static discharger, a device used on airplanes to maintain use of electrical equipment
  - Electrostatic discharge, sudden and momentary electric current flows between two objects
    - Dielectric barrier discharge, the electrical discharge between two electrodes separated by an insulating dielectric barrier
  - Gas-discharge lamp, a light bulb that includes a discharge gas
  - Partial discharge, a temporary breakdown of electrical insulation

== Government and law ==
- Discharge (sentence), a criminal sentence where no punishment is imposed
- Bankruptcy discharge, the injunction that bars acts to enforce certain debts
- Discharge petition, the process of bringing a bill out of committee to the floor for a vote without the cooperation of leadership

== Healthcare ==
- Discharge, the flow of fluids from certain parts of the body:
  - Menstruation or other vaginal discharge
  - Mucopurulent discharge, the emission or secretion of fluid containing mucus and pus
  - Nipple discharge, the release of fluid from the nipples of the breasts
  - Rectal discharge, fluid released from the anus
- Emotional discharge, in co-counselling, the ways in which pent-up emotional hurt can be released, e.g. via crying, laughter, etc.
- Patient discharge, the formal ending of inpatient care

== Music ==
- Discharge (album), a self-titled album by Discharge released in 2002
- Discharge (band), British hardcore punk band
- "Discharge", a song by Anthrax from Persistence of Time
