= Hart's inversors =

Planar straight-line mechanisms

Animation of Hart's antiparallelogram, or first inversor. Link dimensions: Crank and fixed: a Rocker: b (anchored at midpoint) Coupler: c (joint at midpoint) $$\begin{align} b &< c \\[4pt] 2a &< \tfrac{1}{2}b + \tfrac{1}{2}c \\[2pt] \tfrac{1}{2}c &< \tfrac{1}{2}b + 2a \end{align}$$

Hart's inversors are two planar mechanisms that provide a perfect straight line motion using only rotary joints. They were invented and published by Harry Hart in 1874–5.

== Hart's first inversor ==
Hart's first inversor, also known as Hart's W-frame, is based on an antiparallelogram. The addition of fixed points and a driving arm make it a 6-bar linkage. It can be used to convert rotary motion to a perfect straight line by fixing a point on one short link and driving a point on another link in a circular arc.

=== Rectilinear bar and quadruplanar inversors ===
Animation to derive a Quadruplanar inversor from Hart's first inversor.

Hart's first inversor is demonstrated as a six-bar linkage with only a single point that travels in a straight line. This can be modified into an eight-bar linkage with a bar that travels in a rectilinear fashion, by taking the ground and input (shown as cyan in the animation), and appending it onto the original output.

A further generalization by James Joseph Sylvester and Alfred Kempe extends this such that the bars can instead be pairs of plates with similar dimensions.

== Hart's second inversor ==
Animation of Hart's A-frame, or second inversor. Link dimensions: (Note: The current documented relationship between the links' dimensions is still heavily incomplete. For a generalization, refer to the following GeoGebra Applet: [Open Applet]) Double rocker: 3a + a (distance between anchors: 2b) Coupler: b Tip of the A: 2a

Hart's second inversor, also known as Hart's A-frame, is less flexible in its dimensions, but has the useful property that the motion perpendicularly bisects the fixed base points. It is shaped like a capital A – a stacked trapezium and triangle. It is also a 6-bar linkage.

== Example dimensions ==
These are the example dimensions that you see in the animations on the right.

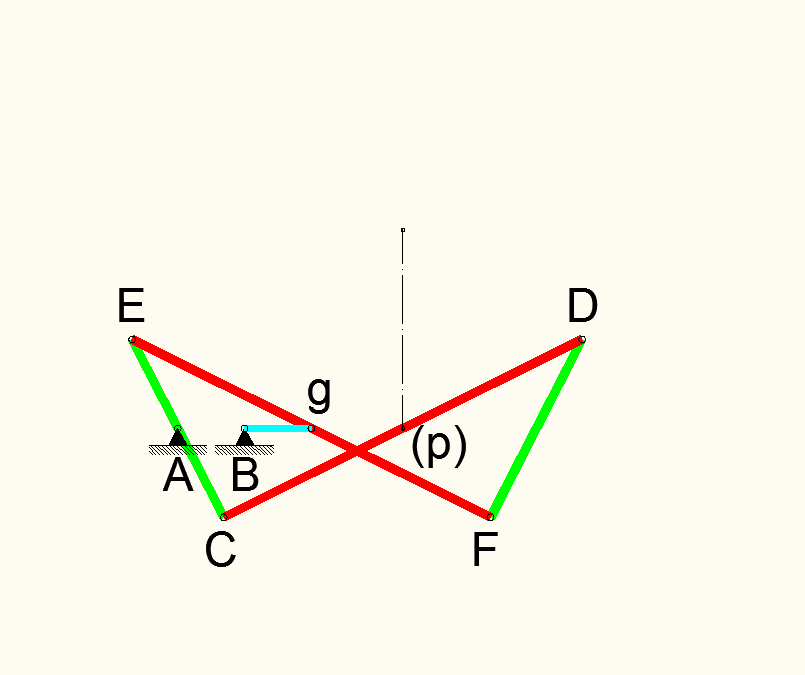
- Hart's first inversor:
- AB = Bg = 2
- CE = FD = 6
- CA = AE = 3
- CD = EF = 12
- Cp = pD = Eg = gF = 6

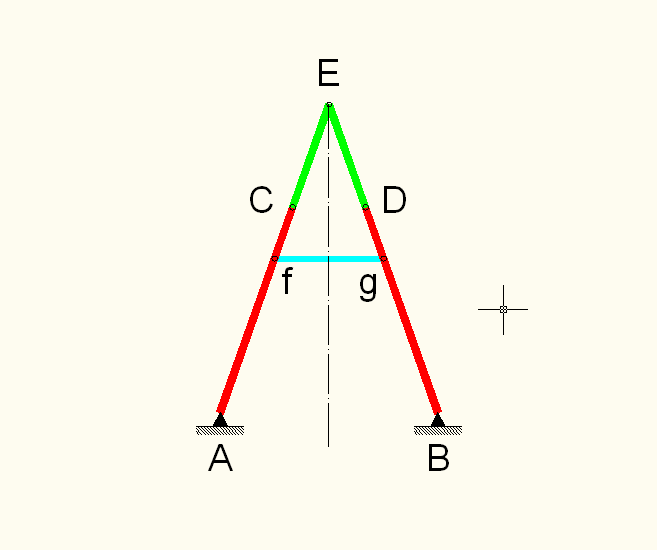
- Hart's second inversor:
- AB = AC = BD = 4
- CE = ED = 2
- Af = Bg = 3
- fC = gD = 1
- fg = 2

== See also ==
- Linkage (mechanical)
- Quadruplanar inversor, a generalization of Hart's first inversor
- Straight line mechanism
