= Five color theorem =

Planar maps require at most five colors

A five-color map: note that this map is also four-colorable

The five color theorem is a result from graph theory that given a plane separated into regions, such as a political map of the countries of the world, the regions may be colored using no more than five colors in such a way that no two adjacent regions receive the same color. Adjacent means that two regions share a common boundary of non-zero length (i.e., not merely a corner where three or more regions meet). (Note: From Gonthier (2008) (defining the stronger four color theorem): "Definitions: A planar map is a set of pairwise disjoint subsets of the plane, called regions. A simple map is one whose regions are connected open sets. Two regions of a map are adjacent if their respective closures have a common point that is not a corner of the map. A point is a corner of a map if and only if it belongs to the closures of at least three regions. Theorem: The regions of any simple planar map can be colored with only four colors, in such a way that any two adjacent regions have different colors.")

The five color theorem is a fortiori implied by the stronger four color theorem, but is considerably easier to prove. It was first proved by Percy John Heawood in 1890, based on a purported proof of the four color theorem given by Alfred Kempe in 1879. That proof had been considered correct for 11 years, but Heawood found an error in it; he did manage to give a correct proof of the weaker five color theorem, based on Kempe's work. The first correct proof of the four color theorem was found only in 1976.

== Outline of the proof by contradiction ==
First of all, one associates a simple planar graph $G$ to the given map, namely one puts a vertex in each region of the map, then connects two vertices with an edge if and only if the corresponding regions share a common border. The problem is then translated into a graph coloring problem: one has to paint the vertices of the graph so that no edge has endpoints of the same color.

Because $G$ is a simple planar graph, i.e. it may be embedded in the plane without intersecting edges, and it does not have two vertices sharing more than one edge, and it does not have loops, then it can be shown (using the Euler characteristic of the plane) that it must have a vertex shared by at most five edges. (Note: This is the only place where the five-color condition is used in the proof. If this technique is used to prove the four-color theorem, it will fail on this step, since there are some graphs that do not have any vertex shared by at most four edges. A notable counterexample is the icosahedral graph: as a 5-regular and planar graph it does not have any vertex shared by at most four edges). Find such a vertex, and call it $v$.

Now remove $v$ from $G$. The graph $G'$ obtained this way has one fewer vertex than $G$, so we can assume by induction that it can be colored with only five colors. If the coloring did not use all five colors on the five neighboring vertices of $v$, it can be colored in $G$ with a color not used by the neighbors. So now look at those five vertices $v_1$, $v_2$, $v_3$, $v_4$, $v_5$ that were adjacent to $v$ in cyclic order (which depends on how we write G). So we can assume that $v_1$, $v_2$, $v_3$, $v_4$, $v_5$ are colored with colors 1, 2, 3, 4, 5 respectively.

Now consider the subgraph $G_{1,3}$ of $G'$ consisting of the vertices that are colored with colors 1 and 3 only and the edges connecting them. To be clear, each edge connects a color 1 vertex to a color 3 vertex (this is called a Kempe chain). If $v_1$ and $v_3$ lie in different connected components of $G_{1,3}$, we can swap the 1 and 3 colors on the component containing $v_1$ without affecting the coloring of the rest of $G'$. This frees color 1 for $v$ completing the task. If on the contrary $v_1$ and $v_3$ lie in the same connected component of $G_{1,3}$, we can find a path in $G_{1,3}$ joining them that consists of only color 1 and 3 vertices.

Now turn to the subgraph $G_{2,4}$ of $G'$ consisting of the vertices that are colored with colors 2 and 4 only and the edges connecting them, and apply the same arguments as before. Then either we are able to reverse the 2-4 coloration on the subgraph of $G_{2,4}$ containing $v_2$ and paint $v$ color 2, or we can connect $v_2$ and $v_4$ with a path that consists of only color 2 and 4 vertices. Such a path would intersect the 1-3 colored path we constructed before since $v_1$ through $v_5$ were in cyclic order. This clearly contradicts the planarity of the graph.

So $G$ can in fact be five-colored, contrary to the initial presumption.

== Linear time five-coloring algorithm ==
Multiple authors, beginning with Lipton and Miller in 1978, have studied efficient algorithms for five-coloring planar graphs. The algorithm of Lipton and Miller took time $O(n\log n)$, but subsequent researchers reduced the time bound to $O(n)$. The version below is from a 1996 paper by Robertson, Sanders, Seymour, and Thomas, which describes it briefly in connection with a slower $O(n^2)$-time algorithm for four-coloring. The algorithm as described here operates on multigraphs and relies on the ability to have multiple copies of edges between a single pair of vertices. It is based on Wernicke's theorem, which states the following:

Wernicke's theorem: Assume G is planar, nonempty, has no faces bounded by two edges, and has minimum degree 5. Then G has a vertex of degree 5 which is adjacent to a vertex of degree at most 6.

We will use a representation of the graph in which each vertex maintains a circular linked list of adjacent vertices, in clockwise planar order.

In concept, the algorithm is recursive, reducing the graph to a smaller graph with one less vertex, five-coloring that graph, and then using that coloring to determine a coloring for the larger graph in constant time. In practice, rather than maintain an explicit graph representation for each reduced graph, we will remove vertices from the graph as we go, adding them to a stack, then color them as we pop them back off the stack at the end. We will maintain three stacks:

- S_{4}: Contains all remaining vertices with either degree at most four, or degree five and at most four distinct adjacent vertices (due to multiple edges).
- S_{5}: Contains all remaining vertices that have degree five, five distinct adjacent vertices, and at least one adjacent vertex with degree at most six.
- S_{d}: Contains all vertices deleted from the graph so far, in the order that they were deleted.

The algorithm works as follows:

1. In the first step, we collapse all multiple edges to single edges, so that the graph is simple. Next, we iterate over the vertices of the graph, pushing any vertex matching the conditions for S_{4} or S_{5} onto the appropriate stack.
2. Next, as long as S_{4} is non-empty, we pop v from S_{4} and delete v from the graph, pushing it onto S_{d}, along with a list of its neighbors at this point in time. We check each former neighbor of v, pushing it onto S_{4} or S_{5} if it now meets the necessary conditions.
3. When S_{4} becomes empty, we know that our graph has minimum degree five. If the graph is empty, we go to the final step 5 below. Otherwise, Wernicke's Theorem tells us that S_{5} is nonempty. Pop v off S_{5}, delete it from the graph, and let v_{1}, v_{2}, v_{3}, v_{4}, v_{5} be the former neighbors of v in clockwise planar order, where v_{1} is the neighbor of degree at most 6. We check if v_{1} is adjacent to v_{3} (which we can do in constant time due to the degree of v_{1}). There are two cases:
  1. If v_{1} is not adjacent to v_{3}, we can merge these two vertices into a single vertex. To do this, we remove v from both circular adjacency lists, and then splice the two lists together into one list at the point where v was formerly found. Provided that v maintains a reference to its position in each list, this can be done in constant time. It's possible that this might create faces bounded by two edges at the two points where the lists are spliced together; we delete one edge from any such faces. After doing this, we push v_{3} onto S_{d}, along with a note that v_{1} is the vertex that it was merged with. Any vertices affected by the merge are added or removed from the stacks as appropriate.
  2. Otherwise, v_{2} lies inside the face outlined by v, v_{1}, and v_{3}. Consequently, v_{2} cannot be adjacent to v_{4}, which lies outside this face. We merge v_{2} and v_{4} in the same manner as v_{1} and v_{3} above.
4. Go to step 2.
5. At this point S_{4}, S_{5}, and the graph are empty. We pop vertices off S_{d}. If the vertex were merged with another vertex in step 3, the vertex that it was merged with will already have been colored, and we assign it the same color. This is valid because we only merged vertices that were not adjacent in the original graph. If we had removed it in step 2 because it had at most 4 adjacent vertices, all of its neighbors at the time of its removal will have already been colored, and we can simply assign it a color that none of its neighbors is using.

== Alternate proof ==
Kainen (1974) provides a simplified proof of the five color theorem, based on the non-planarity of K_{6} (the complete graph with 6 vertices) and graph minors. This proof generalizes to graphs that can be made planar by deleting 2 edges.

== See also ==
- Four color theorem
