= Mnëv's universality theorem =

Realization of semialgebraic sets by points

In mathematics, Mnëv's universality theorem is a result in the intersection of combinatorics and algebraic geometry used to represent algebraic (or semialgebraic) varieties as realization spaces of oriented matroids. Informally it can also be understood as the statement that point configurations of a fixed combinatorics can show arbitrarily complicated behavior. The precise statement is as follows:

Let $V$ be a semialgebraic variety in ${\mathbb R}^n$ defined over the integers. Then $V$ is stably equivalent to the realization space of some oriented matroid.

The theorem was discovered by Nikolai Mnëv in his 1986 Ph.D. thesis.

== Oriented matroids ==
For the purposes of this article, an oriented matroid of a finite subset $S\subset {\mathbb R}^n$ is the list of partitions of $S$ induced by hyperplanes in ${\mathbb R}^n$ (each oriented hyperplane partitions $S$ into the points on the "positive side" of the hyperplane, the points on the "negative side" of the hyperplane, and the points that lie on the hyperplane). In particular, an oriented matroid contains the full information of the incidence relations in $S$, inducing on $S$ a matroid structure.

The realization space of an oriented matroid is the space of all configurations of points $S\subset {\mathbb R}^n$ inducing the same oriented matroid structure.

== Stable equivalence of semialgebraic sets ==
For the purpose of this article stable equivalence of semialgebraic sets is defined as described below.

Let $U$ and $V$ be semialgebraic sets, obtained as a disjoint union of connected semialgebraic sets

$U=U_1\coprod \cdots\coprod U_k\,$ and $\,V=V_1\coprod \cdots\coprod V_k$

We say that $U$ and $V$ are rationally equivalent if there exist homeomorphisms $\phi_i:U_i \to V_i$ defined by rational maps.

Let $U\subset {\mathbb R}^{n+d}, V\subset {\mathbb R}^{n}$ be semialgebraic sets,

$U=U_1\coprod \cdots\coprod U_k\,$ and $\,V=V_1\coprod \cdots\coprod V_k$

with $U_i$ mapping to $V_i$ under the natural projection $\pi$ deleting the last $d$ coordinates. We say that $\pi: U \to V$ is a stable projection if there exist integer polynomial maps
$$\varphi_1, \ldots, \varphi_\ell, \psi_1, \dots, \psi_m:\; {\mathbb R}^n \to {\mathbb R}^d$$
such that
$$U_i =\{ (v,v') \in {\mathbb R}^{n+d}\mid v\in V_i \text{ and } \langle \varphi_a(v), v'\rangle >0, \langle \psi_b(v), v'\rangle=0 \text{ for } a=1,\dots, \ell, b = 1, \dots, m\}.$$
The stable equivalence is an equivalence relation on semialgebraic subsets generated by stable projections and rational equivalence.

== Implications ==
Mnëv's universality theorem has numerous applications in algebraic geometry, due to Laurent Lafforgue, Ravi Vakil and others, allowing one to construct moduli spaces with arbitrarily bad behaviour. This theorem together with Kempe's universality theorem has been used also by Kapovich and Millson in the study of the moduli spaces of linkages and arrangements.

Mnëv's universality theorem also gives rise to the universality theorem for convex polytopes. In this form it states that every semialgebraic set is stably equivalent to the realization space of some convex polytope. Jürgen Richter-Gebert showed that universality already applies to polytopes of dimension four.
