= Paul A. Catlin =

American mathematician

Paul Allen Catlin
- Born: June 25, 1948; Bridgeport, Connecticut, United States
- Died: April 20, 1995 (aged 46)
- Education: Carnegie Mellon University; Ohio State University
- Known for: Graph theory Number theory
- Scientific career
- Fields: Mathematics
- Workplaces: Wayne State University
- Thesis: Embedding subgraphs and coloring graphs under extremal degree conditions (1976)
- Doctoral advisor: G. Neil Robertson

Paul Allen Catlin (June 25, 1948 – April 20, 1995) was a mathematician, professor of mathematics who worked in graph theory and number theory. He wrote a significant paper on the series of chromatic numbers and Brooks' theorem, titled Hajós graph coloring conjecture: variations and counterexamples.

== Career ==
Originally from Bridgeport, Connecticut, Catlin majored in Mathematics with a B.A. degree from Carnegie Mellon University in 1970.

Catlin held a Doctorate in Mathematics degree from Ohio State University. From 1972 to 1973, he was a research and teaching assistant at Ohio State University, where he earned the Master of Science degree in Mathematics.

In 1976, he went to work at Wayne State University, where he concentrated the research on chromatic numbers and Brooks' theorem. As a result, Catlin published a significant paper in that series: Hajós graph coloring conjecture: variations and counterexamples., which showed that the conjecture raised by Hugo Hadwiger is further strengthened not only by $k \le 4$ but also by $k \ge 7$, which led to the joint paper written with Paul Erdős and Béla Bollobás titled Hadwiger's conjecture is true for almost every graph.

He authored over fifty academic papers in number theory and graph theory. Many of his contributions and collaborations have been published in The Fibonacci Quarterly, in The Journal of Number Theory, in the Journal of Discrete Mathematics, and many other academic publications. He co-authored scholarly papers with Arthur M. Hobbs, Béla Bollobás and Paul Erdős, Hong-Jian Lai, Zheng-Yiao Han, and Yehong Shao, among others. He also published papers with G. Neil Robertson, with whom he also completed his dissertation thesis in 1976.

== Selected publications ==
- Paul A. Catlin; Hong-Jian Lai; Yehong Shao (2009). "Edge-connectivity and edge-disjoint spanning trees". Discrete Mathematics. 309 (5): 1033–1040. doi:10.1016/j.disc.2007.11.056.
- Paul A. Catlin; Arthur M. Hobbs; Hong-jian Lai (2001). "Graph family operations". Discrete Mathematics. 230 (1–3): 71–97. doi:10.1016/S0012-365X(00)00071-6.
- Paul Catlin; Arthur M. Hobbs; Hong-Jian Lai; Neil Robertson (2001). "Preface: Paul Catlin 1948-1995". Journal of Sound and Vibration.
- Paul A. Catlin; S. Brownsellt; D. A. Bradley; R. Bragg; J. Carlier (1999). "Do users want telecare and can it be cost-effective". Proceedings of the First Joint BMES/EMBS Conference. 1999 IEEE Engineering in Medicine and Biology 21st Annual Conference and the 1999 Annual Fall Meeting of the Biomedical Engineering Society (Cat. No.99CH37015). Annual International Conference of the IEEE Engineering in Medicine and Biology Society. Vol. 2. p. 714. doi:10.1109/IEMBS.1999.803869. ISBN 0-7803-5674-8.
- Paul A. Catlin (1977). "Embedding subgraphs under extremal degree conditions" (PDF). Congressus Numerantium. 19: 136–45.
- Paul A. Catlin; Zheng-yiao Han; Hong-jian Lai (1996). "Graphs without spanning closed trails". Discrete Mathematics. 160 (1–3): 81–91. doi:10.1016/S0012-365X(95)00149-Q.
- Paul A. Catlin (1996). "The reduction of graph families closed under contraction". Discrete Mathematics. 160 (1–3): 67–80. doi:10.1016/0012-365X(95)00150-U.
- Paul A. Catlin (1970). "Concerning the iterated $\phi$ function" (PDF). The American Mathematical Monthly. 77 (1): 60–61. doi:10.2307/2316857. JSTOR 2316857.
- Paul A. Catlin (1974). "On the divisors of second-order recurrence" (PDF). Fibonacci Quarterly. 12 (2).
- Paul A. Catlin (1974). "Lower bound for the period of the Fibonacci series modulo $m$" (PDF). Fibonacci Quarterly. 12 (4): 349–50.
- Paul A. Catlin (1974). "On the multiplication of recurrences" (PDF). Fibonacci Quarterly. 12: 365–68.
- Paul A. Catlin (1990). "Graphs without nontrivial collapsible subgraphs" (PDF). Congressus Numerantium. 74: 233–38.
- Paul A. Catlin; Hong-jian Lai (1996). "Supereulerian Graphs and the Petersen Graph". Journal of Combinatorial Theory. 66 (1): 123–139. doi:10.1006/jctb.1996.0009.
- Paul A. Catlin (1979). "Hajós' graph-coloring conjecture: Variations and counterexamples" (PDF). Journal of Combinatorial Theory. 26 (2): 268–274. doi:10.1016/0095-8956(79)90062-5.
- Paul A. Catlin (1979). "Brooks' graph-coloring theorem and the independence number". Journal of Combinatorial Theory. 27 (1): 42–48. doi:10.1016/0095-8956(79)90066-2.
- Paul A. Catlin (1996). "A reduction criterion for super-Eulerian graphs". Journal of Graph Theory. 22 (2): 151–153. doi:10.1002/(sici)1097-0118(199606)22:2<151::aid-jgt5>3.0.co;2-m.
- Catlin, Paul A. (1991). "Spanning trails joining two given edges" (PDF). In Alavi, Yousef; Schwenk, Allen; Chartrand, G (eds.). Graph Theory, Combinatorics, and Applications. Wiley and Sons, Inc. pp. 207–22.
- Paul A. Catlin; Hong-jian Lai (1995). "Vertex arboricity and maximum degree" (PDF). Discrete Mathematics. 141 (1–3): 37–46. doi:10.1016/0012-365X(93)E0205-I.
- Catlin, Paul A.; Chen, Zhi-Hong (1991). "Chapter 10: The arboricity of the random graph". In Alavi, Yousef (ed.). Graph theory, combinatorics, algorithms, and applications. Society for Industrial and Applied Mathematics. ISBN 978-0898712872.
- Paul A. Catlin (1992). "Super-Eulerian graphs: A survey". Journal of Graph Theory. 16 (2): 177–196. CiteSeerX 10.1.1.385.2901. doi:10.1002/jgt.3190160209.
- Paul A. Catlin; Jerrold W. Grossman; Arthur M. Hobbs; Hong-jian Lai (1992). "Fractional Arboricity Strength and Principal Partitions in Graphs and Matroids". Discrete Applied Mathematics. 40 (3): 285–302. doi:10.1016/0166-218X(92)90002-R.
- Paul A. Catlin (1978). "Nonisomorphic graphs having the same vertex neighborhood family". Congressus Numerantium. 21: 189–93.
- Catlin, Paul A.; Chen, Zhi-Hong (1991). "Chapter 7: Non-super-Eulerian graphs with large size" (PDF). In Y. Alavi (ed.). Graph theory, combinatorics, algorithms, and applications. pp. 83–95.
- Paul A. Catlin; T. N. Janakiraman Iqbalunnisa; N. Srinivasan (1990). "Hamilton cycles and closed trails in iterated line graphs" (PDF). Journal of Graph Theory. 14 (3): 347–364. CiteSeerX 10.1.1.385.3357. doi:10.1002/jgt.3190140308.
- Paul A. Catlin (1989). "Double cycle covers and the petersen graph". Journal of Graph Theory. 13 (4): 465–483. doi:10.1002/jgt.3190130408.
- Paul A. Catlin (1989). "Spanning Eulerian subgraphs and matchings". Discrete Mathematics. 76 (2): 95–116. doi:10.1016/0012-365X(89)90303-8.
- Paul A. Catlin (1988). "A reduction method to find spanning Eulerian subgraphs" (PDF). Journal of Graph Theory. 12 (1): 29–44. doi:10.1002/jgt.3190120105.
- Paul A. Catlin (1988). "Contractions of graphs with no spanning Eulerian subgraphs". Combinatorica. 8 (4): 313–321. doi:10.1007/BF02189088. S2CID 30831342.
- Paul A. Catlin (1988). "Graph homomorphisms into the five-cycle". Journal of Combinatorial Theory. 45 (2): 199–211. doi:10.1016/0095-8956(88)90069-X.
- Albertson, Michael O.; Catlin, Paul A.; Gibbons, Luana (1985). "Homomorphisms of 3-chromatic graphs. II" (PDF). Proceedings of the sixteenth Southeastern international conference on combinatorics, graph theory and computing (Boca Raton, Fla., 1985). Congressus Numerantium. Vol. 47. pp. 19–28. MR 0830666.
- Paul A. Catlin (1987). "Spanning trails". Journal of Graph Theory. 11 (2): 161–167. doi:10.1002/jgt.3190110206.
- Paul A. Catlin (1987). "Super-Eulerian graphcollapsible graphs, and four-cycles" (PDF). Congressus Numerantium. 58: 233–46.
- Paul A. Catlin (1988). "Nearly-Eulerian spanning subgraphs" (PDF). Ars Combinatoria. 25: 115–24.
- Béla Bollobás; Paul A. Catlin (1981). "Topological cliques of random graphs". Journal of Combinatorial Theory. 30 (2): 224–227. doi:10.1016/0095-8956(81)90066-6.
- Paul A. Catlin (1979). "Brooks' graph-coloring theorem and the independence number". Journal of Combinatorial Theory. 27 (1): 42–48. doi:10.1016/0095-8956(79)90066-2.
- P Catlin (1979). "Subgraphs with triangular components". Discrete Mathematics. 27 (2): 149–170. doi:10.1016/0012-365X(79)90106-7.
- Paul A. Catlin (1979). "Survey Of Extensions Of Brooks' Graph Coloring Theorem". Annals of the New York Academy of Sciences. 328 (1 Topics i): 95–99. Bibcode:1979NYASA.328...95C. doi:10.1111/j.1749-6632.1979.tb17770.x. S2CID 85819734.
- Paul A. Catlin (1985). "Homomorphisms as a generalization of graph coloring" (PDF). Congressus Numerantium. 50: 179–86.
- P. A. Catlin (1978). "A bound on the chromatic number of a graph". Discrete Mathematics. 22 (1): 81–83. doi:10.1016/0012-365X(78)90049-3.
- Paul A. Catlin (1978). "Another bound on the chromatic number of a graph". Discrete Mathematics. 24 (1): 1–6. doi:10.1016/0012-365X(78)90167-X.
- Paul A. Catlin (1978). "Graph Decompositions Satisfying Extremal Degree Constraints". Journal of Graph Theory. 2 (2): 165–170. doi:10.1002/jgt.3190020210.
- Paul A. Catlin (1990). "Double cycle covers and the Petersen graph, II". Congressus Numerantium. 74: 233–38.
- Paul A. Catlin (1976). "Two problems in metric diophantine approximation I". Journal of Number Theory. 8 (3): 282–288. doi:10.1016/0022-314X(76)90006-8.
- Paul A. Catlin (1976). "Two problems in metric diophantine approximation II". Journal of Number Theory. 8 (3): 289–297. doi:10.1016/0022-314X(76)90007-X.
- Paul A. Catlin; Béla Bollobás; Paul Erdős (1980). "Hadwiger's conjecture is true for almost every graph". European Journal of Combinatorics. 1 (3): 195. doi:10.1016/s0195-6698(80)80001-1.
- Paul A. Catlin (1974). "Subgraphs of graphs I". Discrete Mathematics. 10 (2): 225–233. doi:10.1016/0012-365X(74)90119-8.
- Paul A. Catlin; Arthur M. Hobbs; Hong-Jian Lai (2001). "Graph family operations". Discrete Mathematics. 230 (1–3): 71–97. doi:10.1016/S0012-365X(00)00071-6.
