= John William Theodore Youngs =

American mathematician

John William Theodore Youngs (usually cited as J. W. T. Youngs, known as Ted Youngs; 21 August 1910 Bilaspur, Chhattisgarh, India – 20 July 1970 Santa Cruz, California) was an American mathematician.

Youngs was the son of a missionary. He completed his undergraduate study at Wheaton College and received his PhD from Ohio State University in 1934 under Tibor Radó. He then taught for 18 years at Indiana University, where for eight years he was chair of the mathematics department. From 1964, he was a professor at the University of California, Santa Cruz, where he developed the mathematics faculty and was chair of the academic senate of the university.

Youngs worked in geometric topology, for example, questions on the Frechét-equivalence of topological maps. He is famous for the Ringel–Youngs theorem (i.e. Ringel and Youngs's 1968 proof of the Heawood conjecture), which is closely related to the analogue of the four-color theorem for surfaces of higher genus.

John Youngs was a consultant for Sandia National Laboratories, the Rand Corporation and the Institute for Defense Analyses as well as a trustee for Carver Research Foundation Institute in Tuskegee. In 1946–1947, he was a Guggenheim Fellow. At the University of Santa Cruz, a mathematics prize for undergraduates is named after him.

== Sources ==
- Obituary in Journal of Combinatorial Theory, vol 13, 1972
