= Georges Gonthier =

Canadian computer scientist

Georges Gonthier is a Canadian computer scientist and practitioner in formal mathematics. He led the formalization of the four color theorem and Feit–Thompson proof of the odd-order theorem. (Both were written using the proof assistant Rocq.)

In 2011, as a principal researcher at Microsoft Research Cambridge, he received the EADS Foundation Grand Prize in Computer Science, given jointly by the European Aeronautic Defence and Space Company and the French Academy of Sciences.

== See also ==
- Flyspeck proof led by Thomas Callister Hales
