= Daniel P. Sanders =

American mathematician

Daniel P. Sanders is an American mathematician. He is known for his 1996 efficient proof (algorithm) of proving the Four color theorem (with Neil Robertson, Paul Seymour, and Robin Thomas). He was a guest professor of the department of computer science at Columbia University.

Sanders received his Ph.D. in algorithms, combinatorics, and optimization from Georgia Tech in 1993 under the guidance of professor Robin Thomas. He was the Graph Theory Resources editor of www.graphtheory.com. Sanders is a quantitative strategist at Renaissance Technologies. He has been on the faculty of the mathematics departments of Ohio State University and Princeton University.

== Select work ==
- On linear recognition of tree-width at most four, DP Sanders - SIAM Journal on Discrete Mathematics, 1996 - link.aip.org
- Efficiently four-coloring planar graphs, - gatech.edu [PS], N Robertson, DP Sanders, P Seymour, R Thomas - Proceedings of the twenty-eighth annual ACM symposium on …, 1996 - portal.acm.org
