= Dorothea Blostein =

Canadian computer scientist

Dorothea Blostein (née Haken) is a Canadian computer scientist who works as a professor of computer science at Queen's University. She has published well-cited publications on computer vision,^{[BA]} image analysis,^{[ZBC]} and graph rewriting,^{[BFG]} and is known as one of the authors of the master theorem for divide-and-conquer recurrences.^{[BHS]} Her research interests also include biomechanics and tensegrity.

Blostein is the daughter of mathematician Wolfgang Haken, and while she was in high school and college she helped check her father's proof of the four color theorem. She did her undergraduate studies at the University of Illinois at Urbana–Champaign, earning a B.Sc. in 1978, and then received a master's degree from Carnegie Mellon University in 1980. She returned to the University of Illinois for her doctoral studies, completing a Ph.D. in 1987, under the supervision of Narendra Ahuja.

Her husband, Steven D. Blostein, is a professor of electrical and computer engineering at Queen's University.

== Selected publications ==
BHS.	Bentley, Jon Louis; Haken, Dorothea; Saxe, James B. (1980), "A general method for solving divide-and-conquer recurrences", ACM SIGACT News, 12 (3): 36–44, doi:10.1145/1008861.1008865, S2CID 40642274

BA.	Blostein, Dorothea; Ahuja, Narendra (1989), "Shape from texture: integrating texture-element extraction and surface estimation", IEEE Transactions on Pattern Analysis and Machine Intelligence, 11 (12): 1233–1251, Bibcode:1989ITPAM..11.1233B, doi:10.1109/34.41363

BFG.	Blostein, Dorothea; Fahmy, Hoda; Grbavec, Ann (1996), "Issues in the practical use of graph rewriting", in Cuny, Janice; Ehrig, Hartmut; Engels, Gregor; Rozenberg, Grzegorz (eds.), Graph Grammars and Their Application to Computer Science: 5th International Workshop, Williamsburg, VA, USA, November 13–18, 1994, Selected Papers, Lecture Notes in Computer Science, vol. 1073, Berlin: Springer, pp. 38–55, doi:10.1007/3-540-61228-9_78, ISBN 978-3-540-68388-9

ZBC.	Zanibbi, Richard; Blostein, Dorothea; Cordy, James R. (2002), "Recognizing mathematical expressions using tree transformation", IEEE Transactions on Pattern Analysis and Machine Intelligence, 24 (11): 1455–1467, Bibcode:2002ITPAM..24.1455Z, doi:10.1109/TPAMI.2002.1046157, S2CID 2483393
