= Neil Robertson (mathematician) =

Canadian-American mathematician (born 1938)

- Born: November 30, 1938 (age 87)
- Education: University of Waterloo,
- Known for: Robertson–Seymour theorem
- Awards: Pólya Prize (SIAM) (2004, 2006)
- Scientific career
- Fields: Mathematician
- Workplaces: Ohio State University
- Thesis: Graphs Minimal under Girth, Valency and Connectivity Constraints (1969)
- Doctoral advisor: William Tutte
- Doctoral students: Paul A. Catlin

George Neil Robertson (born November 30, 1938) is a mathematician working mainly in topological graph theory, currently a distinguished professor emeritus at the Ohio State University.

== Education ==
Robertson earned his B.Sc. from Brandon College in 1959 and his Ph.D. in 1969 at the University of Waterloo under his doctoral advisor William Tutte.

== Biography ==
In 1969, Robertson joined the faculty of the Ohio State University, where he was promoted to Associate Professor in 1972 and Professor in 1984. He was a consultant with Bell Communications Research from 1984 to 1996. He has held visiting faculty positions in many institutions, most extensively at Princeton University from 1996 to 2001, and at Victoria University of Wellington, New Zealand, in 2002. He also holds an adjunct position at King Abdulaziz University in Saudi Arabia.

== Research ==
Robertson is known for his work in graph theory, and particularly for a long series of papers co-authored with Paul Seymour and published over a span of many years, in which they proved the Robertson–Seymour theorem (formerly called Wagner's Conjecture). This states that families of graphs closed under the graph minor operation may be characterized by a finite set of forbidden minors. As part of this work, Robertson and Seymour also proved the graph structure theorem describing the graphs in these families.

Additional major results in Robertson's research include the following:

- In 1964, Robertson discovered the Robertson graph, the smallest possible 4-regular graph with girth five.
- In 1993, with Seymour and Robin Thomas, Robertson proved the $K_6$-free case for which the Hadwiger conjecture relating graph coloring to graph minors is known to be true.
- In 1996, Robertson, Seymour, Thomas, and Daniel P. Sanders published a new proof of the four color theorem, confirming the Appel–Haken proof which until then had been disputed. Their proof also leads to an efficient algorithm for finding 4-colorings of planar graphs.
- In 2006, Robertson, Seymour, Thomas, and Maria Chudnovsky, proved the long-conjectured strong perfect graph theorem characterizing the perfect graphs by forbidden induced subgraphs.

== Awards and honors ==
Robertson has won the Fulkerson Prize three times, in 1994 for his work on the Hadwiger conjecture, in 2006 for the Robertson–Seymour theorem, and in 2009 for his participation in the proof of the strong perfect graph theorem.

He also won the Pólya Prize (SIAM) in 2004, the OSU Distinguished Scholar Award in 1997, and the Waterloo Alumni Achievement Medal in 2002. In 2012 he became a fellow of the American Mathematical Society.

== See also ==
- List of University of Waterloo people
