= Sigrún Andradóttir =

Icelandic American operations researcher

Sigrún Andradóttir is an Icelandic and American operations researcher, and a professor in the H. Milton Stewart School of Industrial and Systems Engineering at Georgia Tech. Her research focuses on discrete-event simulation and simulation-based optimization.

== Education and career ==
Andradóttir graduated from the University of Iceland with a bachelor's degree in mathematics in 1986. She continued her studies at Stanford University, where she received a master's degree in statistics in 1989 and completed her Ph.D. in operations research in 1990. Her dissertation, Stochastic Optimization with Applications to Discrete Event Systems, was supervised by Peter W. Glynn.

She became an assistant professor at the University of Wisconsin–Madison in 1990; she was affiliated there with the Departments of Industrial Engineering, Mathematics, and Computer Sciences, and was tenured as an associate professor, before moving to her present position at Georgia Tech.

== Personal life ==
Andradóttir was married to Czech mathematician Robin Thomas (1962–2020), also a professor at Georgia Tech.
