= Prism graph =

Graph with a prism as its skeleton

In the mathematical field of graph theory, a prism graph is a graph that has one of the prisms as its skeleton.

== Examples ==
The individual graphs may be named after the associated solid:

- Triangular prism graph – 6 vertices, 9 edges
- Cubical graph – 8 vertices, 12 edges
- Pentagonal prism graph – 10 vertices, 15 edges
- Hexagonal prism graph – 12 vertices, 18 edges
- Heptagonal prism graph – 14 vertices, 21 edges
- Octagonal prism graph – 16 vertices, 24 edges
- ...

Y_{3} = GP(3,1)	Y_{4} = Q_{3} = GP(4,1)	Y_{5} = GP(5,1)	Y_{6} = GP(6,1)	Y_{7} = GP(7,1)	Y_{8} = GP(8,1)

Although geometrically the star polygons also form the faces of a different sequence of (self-intersecting and non-convex) prismatic polyhedra, the graphs of these star prisms are isomorphic to the prism graphs, and do not form a separate sequence of graphs.

== Construction ==
Prism graphs are examples of generalized Petersen graphs, with parameters GP(n,1). They may also be constructed as the Cartesian product of a cycle graph with a single edge.

As with many vertex-transitive graphs, the prism graphs may also be constructed as Cayley graphs. The order-n dihedral group is the group of symmetries of a regular n-gon in the plane; it acts on the n-gon by rotations and reflections. It can be generated by two elements, a rotation by an angle of 2π/n and a single reflection, and its Cayley graph with this generating set is the prism graph. Abstractly, the group has the presentation $\langle r,f\mid r^n, f^2, (rf)^2\rangle$ (where r is a rotation and f is a reflection or flip) and the Cayley graph has r and f (or r, r^{−1}, and f) as its generators.

The n-gonal prism graphs with odd values of n may be constructed as circulant graphs $C_{2n}^{2,n}$. However, this construction does not work for even values of n.

== Properties ==
The graph of an n-gonal prism has 2n vertices and 3n edges. They are regular, cubic graphs. Since the prism has symmetries taking each vertex to each other vertex, the prism graphs are vertex-transitive graphs. As polyhedral graphs, they are also 3-vertex-connected planar graphs. Every prism graph has a Hamiltonian cycle. even sided prism graphs are bipartite graphs.

Among all biconnected cubic graphs, the prism graphs have within a constant factor of the largest possible number of 1-factorizations. A 1-factorization is a partition of the edge set of the graph into three perfect matchings, or equivalently an edge coloring of the graph with three colors. Every biconnected n-vertex cubic graph has O(2^{n/2}) 1-factorizations, and the prism graphs have Ω(2^{n/2}) 1-factorizations.

The number of spanning trees of an n-gonal prism graph is given by the formula

$$\frac{n}{2}\bigl( (2+\sqrt{3})^n+(2-\sqrt{3})^n-2)\bigr.$$

For n = 3, 4, 5, ... these numbers are

75, 384, 1805, 8100, 35287, 150528, ... (sequence A006235 in the OEIS).

The n-gonal prism graphs for even values of n are partial cubes. They form one of the few known infinite families of cubic partial cubes, and (except for four sporadic examples) the only vertex-transitive cubic partial cubes.

The pentagonal prism is one of the forbidden minors for the graphs of treewidth three. The triangular prism and cube graph have treewidth exactly three, but all larger prism graphs have treewidth four.

== Related graphs ==
Other infinite sequences of polyhedral graph formed in a similar way from polyhedra with regular-polygon bases include the antiprism graphs (graphs of antiprisms) and wheel graphs (graphs of pyramids). Other vertex-transitive polyhedral graphs include the Archimedean graphs.

If the two cycles of a prism graph are broken by the removal of a single edge in the same position in both cycles, the result is a ladder graph. If these two removed edges are replaced by two crossed edges, the result is a non-planar graph called a Möbius ladder.

A crossed prism graph is similar but pairs up lateral crossed edges, alternating forward and backwards, for even-sided prisms. The set are also regular, vertex transitive cubic graphs, and bipartite graphs (also called bicubic graphs). A 4-crossed prism graph is the same as the cubical graph with 8 vertices, 12 edges. A 6-crossed prism graph is also the Franklin graph with 12 vertices, 18 edges. In An Atlas of Graphs the first few are listed in the set of Connected cubic transitive graphs indexed as Ct5, Ct12, Ct19, Ct29, Ct42, Ct54, and Ct74 for 4, 6, 8, 10, 12, 14, and 16 sides respectively.

First crossed prism graphs as 2 rings of vertices
4	6	8	10	12	14	16
cubical graph	Franklin graph	Ct19	Ct29	Ct42	Ct54	Ct74
