= Percy John Heawood =

British mathematician (1861–1955)

Percy Heawood
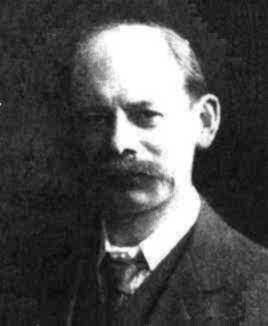
- Born: 8 September 1861; Newport, England
- Died: 24 January 1955 (aged 93); Durham, England
- Known for: Four-color problem

Percy John Heawood (8 September 1861 – 24 January 1955) was a British mathematician, who concentrated on graph colouring.

== Life ==
He was the son of the Rev. John Richard Heawood of Newport, Shropshire, and his wife Emily Heath, daughter of the Rev. Joseph Heath of Wigmore, Herefordshire; and a first cousin of Oliver Lodge, whose mother Grace was also a daughter of Joseph Heath. He was educated at Queen Elizabeth's School, Ipswich, and matriculated at Exeter College, Oxford in 1880, graduating B.A. in 1883 and M.A. in 1887.

Heawood spent his academic career at Durham University, where he was appointed Lecturer in 1885. He was, successively, Censor of St Cuthbert's Society between 1897 and 1901 succeeding Frank Byron Jevons in the role, Senior Proctor of the university from 1901, Professor in 1910 and Vice-Chancellor between 1926 and 1928. He was awarded an OBE, as Honorary Secretary of the Preservation Fund, for his part in raising £120,000 to prevent Durham Castle from collapsing into the River Wear.

Heawood was fond of country pursuits, and one of his interests was Hebrew. His nickname was "Pussy".

Durham University awards an annual Heawood Prize to a student graduating in Mathematics whose performance is outstanding in the final year.

== Works ==
Heawood devoted himself to the four colour theorem and related questions. In 1890 he exposed a flaw in Alfred Kempe's proof, that had been considered as valid for 11 years. The four colour theorem being an open question again, he established the weaker five colour theorem. The four colour theorem itself was finally established by a computer-based proof in 1976.

Heawood also studied colouring of maps on higher surfaces and established the upper bound on the chromatic number of such a graph in terms of the connectivity (genus, or number of handles) of the surface. This upper bound was proved only in 1968 to be the actual maximum.

Writing in the Journal of the London Mathematical Society, G. A. Dirac wrote:

In his appearance, manners and habits of thought, Heawood was an extravagantly unusual man. He had an immense moustache and a meagre, slightly stooping figure. He usually wore an Inverness cape of strange pattern and manifest antiquity, and carried an ancient handbag. His walk was delicate and hasty, and he was often accompanied by a dog, which was admitted to his lectures. ... His transparent sincerity, piety and goodness of heart, and his eccentricity and extraordinary blend of naiveté and shrewdness secured for him not only the fascinated interest, but also the regard and respect of his colleagues.

== Family ==
Heawood married in 1890 Christiana Tristram, daughter of Henry Baker Tristram; they had a son and a daughter.

== See also ==
- Heawood conjecture
- Heawood number
- Heawood graph
- Four color theorem
- Five color theorem

Academic offices
Preceded by Sir Theodore Morison	Vice-Chancellor & Warden of the University of Durham; 1926–1928	Succeeded by Sir Thomas Oliver
