= Narendra Ahuja =

Indian-American computer scientist

- Education: University of Maryland, College Park; Indian Institute of Science, Bangalore; BITS Pilani
- Known for: Face detection, Motion planning, Pattern Recognition
- Awards: IEEE Emanuel R. Piore Award (1999); IEEE Fellow (1992); ACM Fellow (1996); Presidential Young Investigator Award (1984); AAAI Fellow (1992); SPIE Technology Achievement Award (1998)
- Scientific career
- Fields: Computer science, Computer vision, Artificial Intelligence, Robotics
- Workplaces: University of Illinois, Urbana-Champaign; International Institute of Information Technology, Hyderabad
- Thesis: Mosaic Models for Image Analysis and Synthesis (1979)
- Doctoral advisor: Azriel Rosenfeld
- Doctoral students: Dorothea Blostein; Ming-Hsuan Yang

Narendra Ahuja is an Indian-American computer scientist and the Donald Biggar Willett Professor Emeritus in Engineering at the University of Illinois at Urbana–Champaign. His research primarily concerns computer vision and pattern recognition.

== Education and career ==
Ahuja earned a bachelor's degree in 1972 from the Birla Institute of Technology and Science (BITS Pilani) in India. He earned a master's degree in 1974 from the Indian Institute of Science, and completed a Ph.D. in computer science in 1979 from the University of Maryland, College Park, advised by Azriel Rosenfeld. In addition to his work at the University of Illinois, he was founding director of the International Institute of Information Technology, Hyderabad from 1999 to 2002.

== Awards and honors ==
Ahuja was the 1998 recipient of the SPIE Technology Achievement Award, and the 1999 recipient of the IEEE Emanuel R. Piore Award "for contributions to computer vision and image processing". The professional societies in which he is a fellow include the American Association for the Advancement of Science, Association for the Advancement of Artificial Intelligence, Association for Computing Machinery, Institute of Electrical and Electronics Engineers, International Association for Pattern Recognition, and International Society for Optical Engineering.
