= Ming-Hsuan Yang =

American computer scientist

- Occupations: Computer scientist, academic, and author

Academic background
- Education: National Tsing-Hua University (BS); University of Southern California (MS); University of Texas at Austin (MS); University of Illinois at Urbana-Champaign (PhD)
- Doctoral advisors: Narendra Ahuja; Dan Roth

Academic work
- Institutions: University of California, Merced; Google DeepMind; Nvidia; Honda Research Institute

Ming-Hsuan Yang is a computer scientist, academic, and author. He is a professor at the University of California, Merced, and a research scientist at Google DeepMind.

Yang's work is focused on computer vision, machine learning, artificial intelligence, and robotics.

He is a fellow of the Institute of Electrical and Electronics Engineers (IEEE), Association for Computing Machinery (ACM), Association for the Advancement of Artificial Intelligence (AAAI), and American Association for the Advancement of Science (AAAS).

== Education and career ==
Yang received his Ph.D. degree in Computer Science from the University of Illinois at Urbana-Champaign.

Yang worked as a senior research scientist at the Honda Research Institute in Mountain View, California. He joined UC Merced in 2008. Since 2018, he has been a research scientist at Google DeepMind. He previously chaired the IEEE International Conference on Computer Vision (ICCV) and the Asian Conference on Computer Vision (ACCV).

== Research ==
Much of Yang's research has explored intelligent systems such as AI, machine learning, computer vision, and robotics. In a paper published in 2013, Yang assessed online object tracking algorithms through large-scale experiments, identifying methods, benchmarking performance, and highlighting key factors influencing tracking accuracy across different scenarios. He also presented a graph-based manifold ranking approach for saliency detection, integrating foreground and background cues, and benchmark dataset evaluation.

Yang has been named a highly cited researcher from 2018 to 2025.

== Awards and honors ==
- 1999 – Ray Ozzie Fellowship, The Grainger College of Engineering
- 2009 – Google Faculty Award, Google
- 2010 – Distinguished Early Career Research Award, UC Merced
- 2012 – Faculty Early Career Development (CAREER) Award, NSF
- 2014 – Distinguished Research Award, UC Merced
- 2017 – Best Paper Honorable Mention, ACM Symposium on User Interface Software and Technology (UIST)
- 2017 – Nvidia Pioneer Research Award
- 2018 – Best Paper Honorable Mention, IEEE/CVF Conference on Computer Vision and Pattern Recognition (CVPR)
- 2018 – Nvidia Pioneer Research Award
- 2018 – Best Student Paper Honorable Mention, Asian Conference on Computer Vision (ACCV)
- 2019 – Fellow, IEEE
- 2021 – Fellow, ACM
- 2023 – Longuet-Higgins Prize, IEEE Conference on Computer Vision and Pattern Recognition (CVPR)
- 2024 – Best Paper Award, International Conference on Machine Learning (ICML)
- 2025 – Fellow, AAAI
- 2025 – Test-of-Time Award, IEEE Winter Conference on Applications of Computer Vision (WACV)
- 2026 – Fellow, AAAS

== Bibliography ==
=== Books ===
- Yang, Ming-Hsuan; Ahuja, Narendra (2012). Face Detection and Gesture Recognition for Human-Computer Interaction. Kluwer Academic Publishers. ISBN 9781461514237.

=== Selected articles ===
- Yang, M.-H.; Kriegman, D. J.; Ahuja, N. (2002). "Detecting faces in images: A survey". IEEE Transactions on Pattern Analysis and Machine Intelligence. 24 (1): 34–58. doi:10.1109/34.982883.
- Ross, D. A.; Lim, J.; Lin, R. S.; Yang, M.-H. (2008). "Incremental learning for robust visual tracking". International Journal of Computer Vision. 77 (1–3): 125–141. doi:10.1007/s11263-007-0075-7.
- Wu, Y.; Lim, J.; Yang, M.-H. (2013). "Online object tracking: A benchmark". Proceedings of the IEEE Conference on Computer Vision and Pattern Recognition. pp. 2411–2418. doi:10.1109/CVPR.2013.312.
- Lai, W. S.; Huang, J. B.; Ahuja, N.; Yang, M.-H. (2017). "Deep Laplacian pyramid networks for fast and accurate super-resolution". Proceedings of the IEEE Conference on Computer Vision and Pattern Recognition. pp. 624–632. arXiv:1704.03915. doi:10.1109/CVPR.2017.618.
- Gao, S. H.; Cheng, M. M.; Zhao, K.; Zhang, X. Y.; Yang, M.-H.; Torr, P. (2019). "Res2Net: A new multi-scale backbone architecture". IEEE Transactions on Pattern Analysis and Machine Intelligence. 43 (2): 652–662. arXiv:1904.01169. doi:10.1109/TPAMI.2019.2938758. PMID 31484108.
