= Quadruplanar inversor =

Mechanism that provides a perfect straight line motion without sliding guides

Animation to derive a Quadruplanar Inversor from Hart's first inversor. (Note: The midpoints must be displaced such that they not only form similar triangles, but also form a parallelogram (drawn in pink in the transition phase) if they are connected together. The triangles do not need to be right triangles, nor does the pink parallelogram have to be a rectangle. It is entirely coincidental that this happened.)

The Quadruplanar inversor of Sylvester and Kempe is a generalization of Hart's inversor. Like Hart's inversor, is a mechanism that provides a perfect straight line motion without sliding guides.

The mechanism was described in 1875 by James Joseph Sylvester in the journal Nature.

Like Hart's inversor, it is based on an antiparallelogram but the rather than placing the fixed input and output points on the sides (dividing them in fixed proportion so they are all similar), Sylvester recognized that the additional points could be displaced sideways off the sides, as long as they formed similar triangles. Hart's original form is simply the degenerate case of triangles with altitude zero.

A portion of a Hart's linkage is replaced with a one of the four-bar cognate linkages of the underlying antiparallelogram, displayed in pink.

A portion of a Hart's linkage is replaced with the other four-bar cognate linkage of the underlying antiparallelogram, displayed in purple.

As the underlying antiparallelogram has two four-bar cognate linkages, it is possible to introduce either of them into the mechanism. The resulting mechanism is overconstrained, so some of the original links can be removed while keeping the total degrees of freedom of the linkage at one.

== Gallery ==
In these diagrams:

- The antiparallelogram is highlighted in full opacity links.
- Yellow Triangles and Green Triangles are similar.
  - Green Triangles are congruent with each other.
  - Yellow Triangles are congruent with each other.
- Cyan links and Pink links are congruent.
- Dashed links are additional appendages to allow for a link to travel rectilinearly.

=== Example 1 – Sylvester–Kempe Inversor ===
Animation of Example 1

Example Dimensions:
Cyan Links = $2$
Pink Links = $2$

Green Triangles:
Shorter Sides = $\sqrt{2}$
Longest Side = $2$

Yellow Triangles:
Shorter Sides = $\sqrt{10}$
Longest Side = $2\sqrt{5}$

=== Example 2 – Sylvester–Kempe Inversor ===
Animation of Example 2

Example Dimensions:
Cyan Links = $3$
Pink Links = $3$

Green Triangles:
Shorter Sides = $2$
Longest Side = $2\sqrt{2}$

Yellow Triangles:
Shorter Sides = $\sqrt{10}$
Longest Side = $2\sqrt{5}$

=== Example 3 – Sylvester–Kempe Inversor ===
Animation of Example 3

Example Dimensions:

Cyan Links = $4\sqrt{10}$
Pink Links = $4\sqrt{10}$

Green Triangles:
Shortest Side = $5$
Intermediate Side = $4\sqrt{10}$
Longest Side = $15$

Yellow Triangles:
Shortest Side = $5\sqrt{5}$
Intermediate Side = $20\sqrt{2}$
Longest Side = $15\sqrt{5}$

=== Example 4 – Kumara–Kampling Inversor ===
Animation of the Kumara–Kampling Inversor

Created by Fumio Imai and Arglin Kampling. Rather than having the third joint of each triangular link be displaced off to the side, the third joint can also be displaced collinear to the original links, allowing for the links to remain as bars.

Example Dimensions:
Cyan Links = $1$
Pink Links = $1$
Green Links = $0.5\sqrt{10} + 0.5\sqrt{10}$
Yellow Links = $0.5\sqrt{2} + 0.5\sqrt{2}$

== See also ==
- Hart's first inversor / Hart's antiparallelogram / Hart's W-frame, the origination of the Quadruplanar inversor.
- Linkage (mechanical)
- Straight line mechanism

== Notes ==
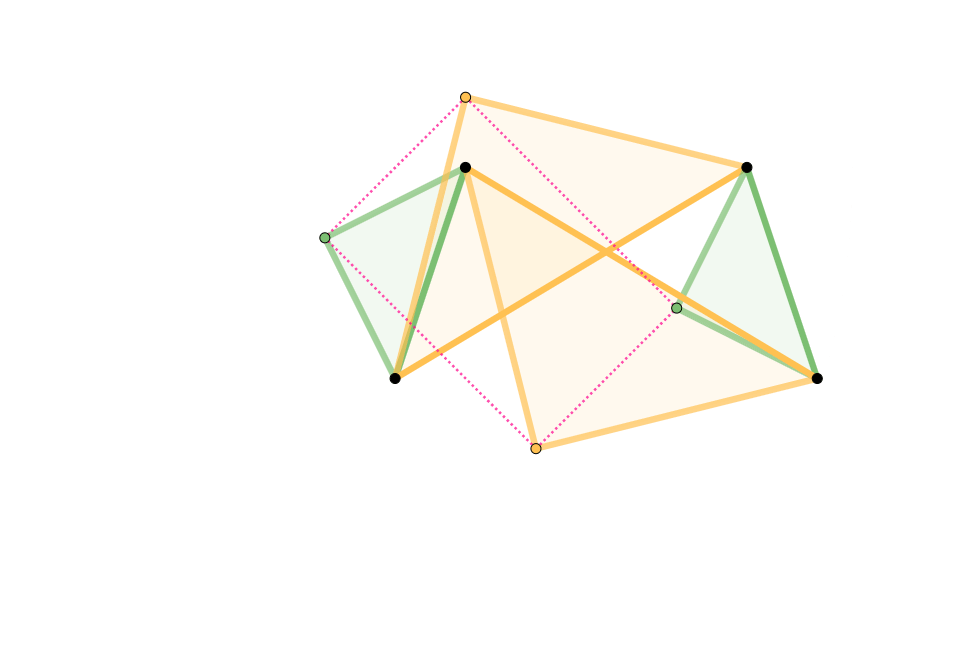
A frame from the first animation for referencing to the note
