= Alfred Kempe =

British mathematician (1849–1922)

Sir Alfred Kempe
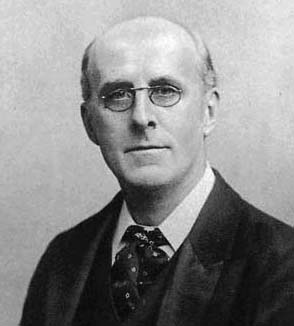
- Born: 7 July 1849; Kensington, London, England
- Died: 21 April 1922 (aged 72); London, England
- Known for: Kempe chain Kempe's universality theorem Sylvester-Kempe inversor
- Awards: Fellow of the Royal Society (1881)

Sir Alfred Bray Kempe FRS (6 July 1849 – 21 April 1922) was a mathematician best known for his work on linkages and the four colour theorem.

== Biography ==
Kempe was the son of the Rector of St James's Church, Piccadilly, the Rev. John Edward Kempe. Among his brothers were Sir John Arrow Kempe and Harry Robert Kempe. He was educated at St Paul's School, London and then studied at Trinity College, Cambridge, where Arthur Cayley was one of his teachers. He graduated BA (22nd wrangler) in 1872. Despite his interest in mathematics he became a barrister, specialising in the ecclesiastical law. He was knighted in 1913, the same year he became the Chancellor for the Diocese of London. He was also Chancellor of the dioceses of Newcastle, Southwell, St Albans, Peterborough, Chichester, and Chelmsford. He received the honorary degree DCL from the University of Durham and he was elected a Bencher of the Inner Temple in 1909.

In 1876 he published his article On a General Method of describing Plane Curves of the nth degree by Linkwork, which presented a procedure for constructing a linkage that traces an arbitrary algebraic plane curve. This was a remarkable generalization of his work on the design of linkages to trace straight lines. This direct connection between linkages and algebraic curves is now called Kempe's universality theorem. While Kempe's proposed proof was flawed, the first complete proof was provided in 2002, based on his ideas.

The Sylvester–Kempe Inversor draws a straight line.

In 1877 Kempe discovered a new straight line linkage called the Quadruplanar inversor or Sylvester–Kempe Inversor and published his influential lectures on the subject. In 1879 Kempe wrote his famous "proof" of the four colour theorem, shown incorrect by Percy Heawood in 1890. Much later, his work led to fundamental concepts such as the Kempe chain and unavoidable sets.

Kempe (1886) revealed a rather marked philosophical bent, and much influenced Charles Sanders Peirce. Kempe also discovered what are now called multisets, although this fact was not noted until long after his death.

Kempe was elected a fellow of the Royal Society in 1881. He was Treasurer and vice-president of the Royal Society 1899–1919. He was a president of the London Mathematical Society from 1892 to 1894. He was also a mountain climber, mostly in Switzerland.

His first wife was Mary, daughter of Sir William Bowman, 1st Baronet; she died in 1893. He then married, in 1897, Ida, daughter of Judge Meadows White, QC. He had two sons and one daughter.
