= Discharger =

In electronics a discharger is a device or circuit that releases stored energy or electric charge from a battery, capacitor or other source.

== Types ==
- metal probe with insulated handle & ground wire, and sometimes resistor (for capacitors)
- resistor (for batteries)
- parasitic discharge (for batteries arranged in parallel)
- more complex electronic circuits (for batteries)

== See also ==
- Bleeder resistor
