= Robin Thomas (mathematician) =

Mathematician (1962–2020)

- Born: August 22, 1962; Prague, Czechoslovakia
- Died: March 26, 2020 (aged 57)
- Education: Charles University
- Awards: Fulkerson Prize; Karel Janeček Foundation Neuron Prize
- Scientific career
- Fields: Mathematics
- Workplaces: Georgia Institute of Technology
- Doctoral advisor: Jaroslav Nešetřil

Robin Thomas (August 22, 1962 – March 26, 2020) was a mathematician working in graph theory at the Georgia Institute of Technology.

Thomas received his doctorate in 1985 from Charles University in Prague, Czechoslovakia (now the Czech Republic), under the supervision of Jaroslav Nešetřil. He joined the faculty at Georgia Tech in 1989, and became a Regents' Professor there, briefly serving as the department chair.

== Personal life ==
Thomas was married to Icelandic operations researcher Sigrún Andradóttir, also a professor at Georgia Tech.

On March 26, 2020, he died of amyotrophic lateral sclerosis at the age of 57 after 12 years of struggle with the illness.

== Awards ==
Thomas was awarded the Fulkerson Prize for outstanding papers in discrete mathematics twice: in 1994 as co-author of a paper on the Hadwiger conjecture, and in 2009 for the proof of the strong perfect graph theorem. In 2011, he was awarded the Karel Janeček Foundation Neuron Prize for Lifetime Achievement in Mathematics. In 2012, he became a fellow of the American Mathematical Society. He was named a SIAM Fellow in 2018. The January 2023 issue of the Journal of Combinatorial Theory, Series B was a tribute to his work.
