= Wolfgang Haken =

German mathematician (1928–2022)

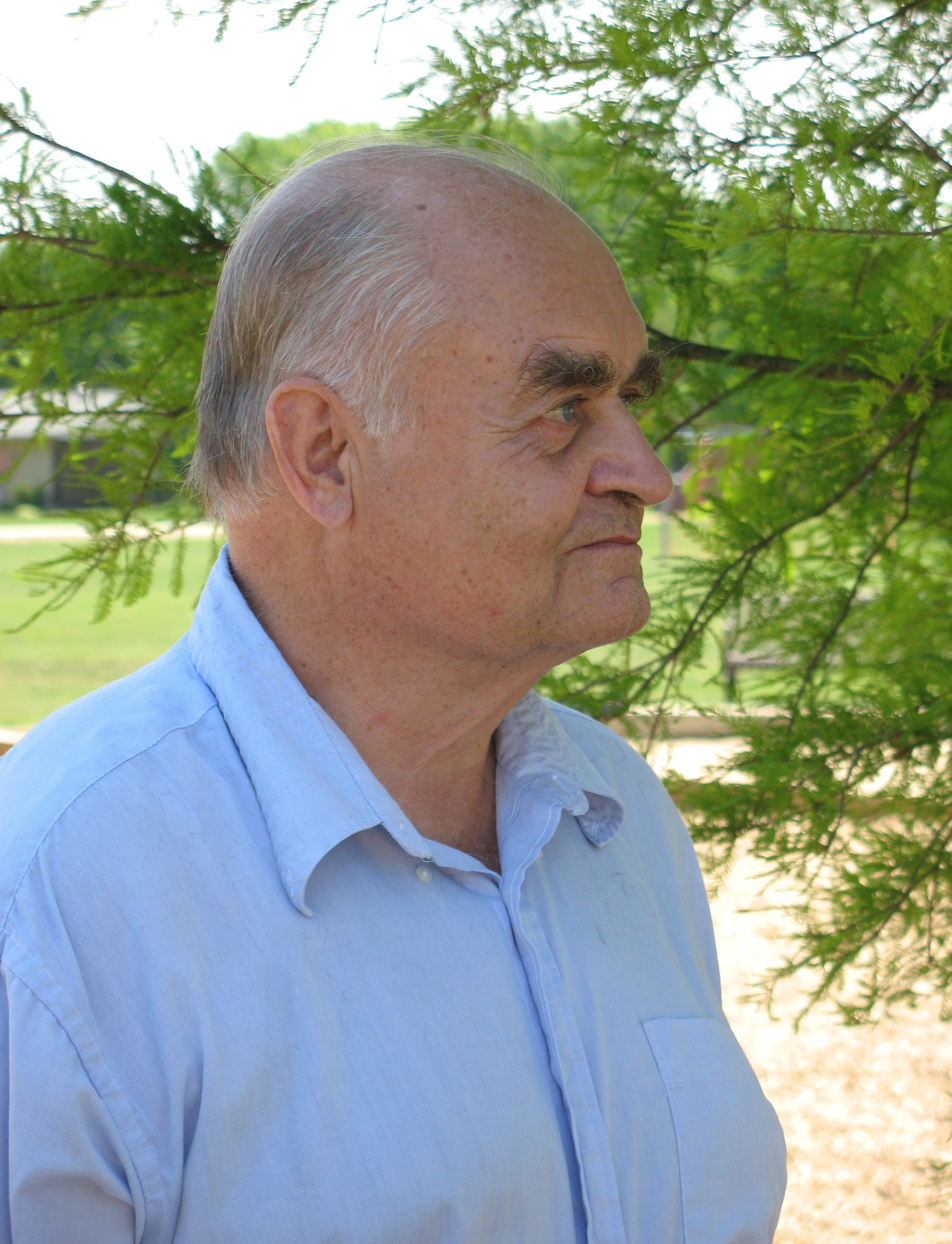
- Haken in 2008
- Born: June 21, 1928; Berlin, Germany
- Died: October 2, 2022 (aged 94); Champaign, Illinois
- Education: Kiel University
- Known for: Solving the four-color theorem
- Scientific career
- Fields: Mathematics
- Workplaces: University of Illinois Urbana-Champaign
- Doctoral advisor: Karl-Heinrich Weise

Wolfgang Haken (German: [ˈvɔlfɡaŋ ˈhaːkn̩]; June 21, 1928 – October 2, 2022) was a German American mathematician who specialized in topology, in particular 3-manifolds.

== Biography ==
Haken was born on June 21, 1928, in Berlin, Germany. His father was Werner Haken, a physicist who had Max Planck as a doctoral thesis advisor. In 1953, Haken earned a Ph.D. degree in mathematics from Christian-Albrechts-Universität zu Kiel (Kiel University) and married Anna-Irmgard von Bredow, who earned a Ph.D. degree in mathematics from the same university in 1959. In 1962, they left Germany so he could accept a position as visiting professor at the University of Illinois at Urbana-Champaign. He became a full professor in 1965, retiring in 1998.

In 1976, together with colleague Kenneth Appel at the University of Illinois at Urbana-Champaign, Haken proved the four-color theorem: they proved that any planar graph can be properly colored using at most four colors. Haken has introduced several ideas, including Haken manifolds, Kneser-Haken finiteness, and an expansion of the work of Kneser into a theory of normal surfaces. Much of his work has an algorithmic aspect, and he is a figure in algorithmic topology. One of his key contributions to this field is an algorithm to detect whether a knot is unknotted.

In 1978, Haken delivered an invited address at the International Congress of Mathematicians in Helsinki. He was a recipient of the 1979 Fulkerson Prize of the American Mathematical Society for his proof with Appel of the four-color theorem.

Haken died in Champaign, Illinois, on October 2, 2022, aged 94.

== Family ==
Haken's eldest son, Armin, proved that there exist propositional tautologies that require resolution proofs of exponential size. Haken's eldest daughter, Dorothea Blostein, is a professor of computer science, known for her discovery of the master theorem for divide-and-conquer recurrences. Haken’s second son, Lippold, is the inventor of the Continuum Fingerboard. Haken’s youngest son, Rudolf, is a professor of music, who established the world's first Electric Strings university degree program at the University of Illinois at Urbana-Champaign. Wolfgang is the cousin of Hermann Haken, a physicist known for laser theory and synergetics.

== See also ==
- Unknotting problem
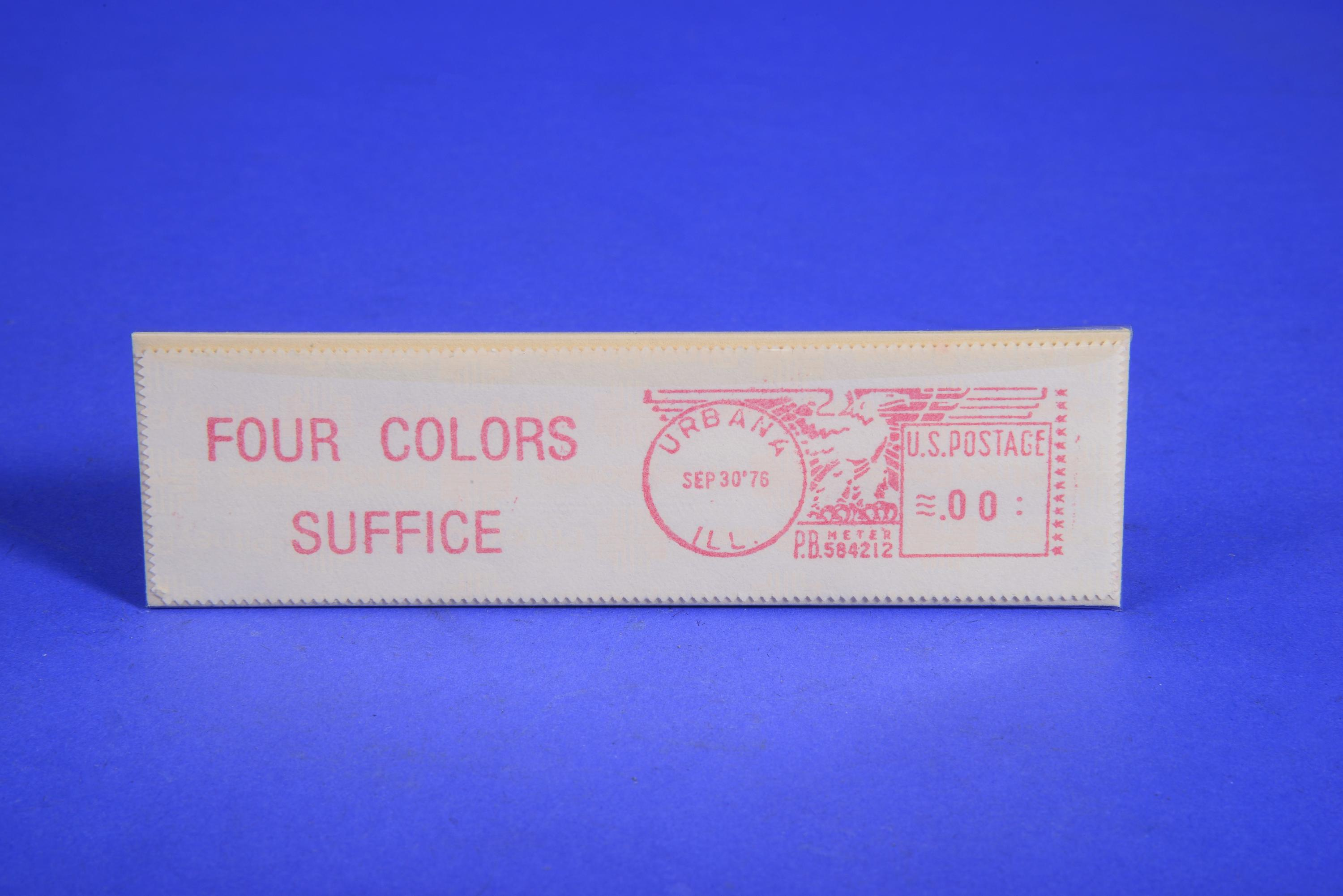
  Celebratory postage of the solution of the four color problem.
