= Straight-line mechanism =

Mechanisms generating real or approximate straight line motion

An animation of Watt's Linkage.

An animation of Roberts linkage

Sarrus Linkage. Parts of the same color are the same dimensions.

Peaucellier-Lipkin Inversor. Links of the same color are the same length.

A straight-line mechanism is a mechanism that converts any type of rotary or angular motion to perfect or near-perfect straight-line motion, or vice versa. Straight-line motion is linear motion of definite length or "stroke", every forward stroke being followed by a return stroke, giving reciprocating motion. The first such mechanism, patented in 1784 by James Watt, produced approximate straight-line motion, referred to by Watt as parallel motion.

Straight-line mechanisms are used in a variety of applications, such as engines, vehicle suspensions, walking robots, and rover wheels.

== History ==
In the late eighteenth century, before the development of the planer and the milling machine, it was extremely difficult to machine straight, flat surfaces. During that era, much thought was given to the problem of attaining a straight-line motion, as this would allow the flat surfaces to be machined. To find a solution to the problem, the first straight-line mechanism was developed by James Watt, for guiding the pistons of early steam engines. Although it does not generate an exact straight line, a good approximation is achieved over a considerable distance of travel.

Perfect straight-line linkages were later discovered in the nineteenth century, but they were not as needed, as by then other techniques for machining had been developed.

== List of linkages ==
=== Approximate straight-line linkages ===
These mechanisms often use four-bar linkages as they require very few pieces. These four-bar linkages have coupler curves that have one or more regions of approximately perfect straight-line motion. The exception in this list is Watt's parallel motion, which combines Watt's linkage with another four-bar linkage – the pantograph – to amplify the existing approximate straight-line movement.

It is not possible to create perfect straight-line motion using a four-bar linkage, without using a prismatic joint.

- Watt's linkage (1784)
- Watt's parallel motion (1784)
- Evans "Grasshopper" linkage (1801)
- Chebyshev linkage
- Chebyshev lambda linkage (1878), a cognate linkage of the Chebyshev linkage
- Roberts linkage
- Horse-head linkage
- Hoecken linkage (1926) – requires a sliding joint

=== Perfect straight-line linkages ===
Eventually, perfect straight line motion was achieved. The Sarrus linkage was the first perfect linear linkage, made in 1853. However, it is a spatial linkage rather than a planar linkage. The first planar linkage would not be made until 1864.

Currently, all planar linkages which produce perfect linear motion utilize the inversion around a circle to produce a hypothetical circle of infinite radius, which is a line. This is why they are called inversors or inversor cells. The simplest solutions are Hart's W-frame–which uses 6-bars–and the quadruplanar inversors–Sylvester-Kempe and Kumara-Kampling, which also use 6-bars.

- Sarrus linkage (1853)
- Peaucellier-Lipkin inversor (1864)
- Hart's first inversor / Hart's antiparallelogram / Hart's W-frame (1874)
- Hart's second inversor / Hart's A-frame (1875)
- Perrolatz inversor
- Kempe's double kite inversors (1875)
- Bricard inversor
- Quadruplanar inversor (1875)

The Scott Russell linkage (1803) translates linear motion through a right angle, but is not a straight-line mechanism in itself. The Grasshopper beam/Evans linkage, an approximate straight-line linkage, and the Bricard linkage, an exact straight-line linkage, share similarities with the Scott Russell linkage and the Trammel of Archimedes.

=== Compound eccentric mechanisms with elliptical motion ===
These mechanisms use the principle of a rolling curve instead of a coupler curve and can convert continuous, rather than just limited, rotary motion to reciprocating motion and vice versa via elliptical motion. The straight-line sinusoidal motion produces no second-order inertial forces, which simplifies balancing in high-speed machines.

- Cardano's hypocyclic gears. Based on the principle of the Tusi couple (1247), a spur gear on a short crank rolls inside an internally toothed ring gear of twice the diameter. The hypocycloid traced by any point on the pitch circle of the smaller gear is a diameter of the larger gear, i.e. a straight line. The mechanism has been used in Murray's Hypocyclic Engine.
- Trammel of Archimedes. Originally an ellipsograph. Also known as the double-slider mechanism, it uses the fact that a circle and a straight line are special cases of an ellipse. It is based on much the same kinematic principle as Cardan's straight line mechanism (above) and could be considered as a spur gear with two teeth in a ring gear with four teeth. It has been used in the Baker-Cross engine. It has been used in inverted form in Parsons' steam engine and can still be found today in further inversions as the Oldham coupling and the scotch yoke mechanism.

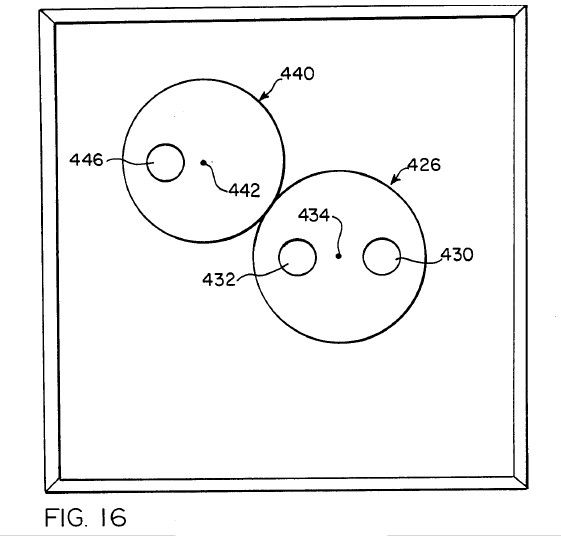
Stiller-Smith eccentric gear train, core features.

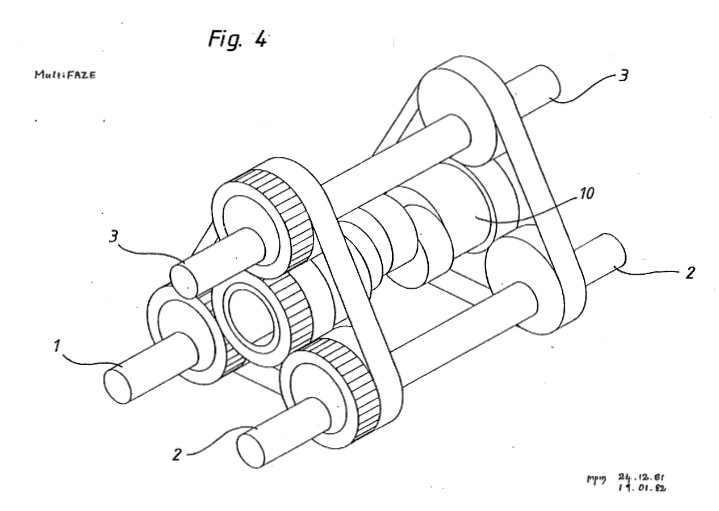
MultiFAZE eccentric gear train for a 3-cylinder radial engine.

- The Stiller-Smith Mechanism is a compound eccentric mechanism that combines a double-slider or cross-slider mechanism with a MultiFAZE eccentric gear train (in the following simply "the gear train") consisting of a set of spur gears of equal size. It converts reciprocating motion to rotary motion and vice versa using the rotary component of the elliptical motion instead of the orbital or circular component.
  Patent No. DE 3232974 published in March 1984 gives Michael Mayer as the inventor of the gear train and describes several embodiments in piston engines including a cruciform engine. A provisional patent application (See Patent No. US 4641611) filed by West Virginia University (USA) in July 1984 gives Profs. Alfred H. Stiller and James E. Smith as joint inventors of the gear train, without citing the Mayer patent. Smith has emphasised the key role of the gear train in the Stiller-Smith Mechanism.
  The difference between the two embodiments of the gear train is that in the Stiller-Smith version, a "floating trammel gear" (Fig. 16, Part No. 426) functions as a cantilever that links two piston rods reciprocating in perpendicular directions, in a floating kinematic chain, while in the earlier Mayer version, an "orbital shaft" (Fig. 4, Part No. 10) is supported at both ends such that it is precisely constrained to execute circular or orbital motion, controlled by eccentrics.
  The West Virginia University patents include two somewhat puzzling variants of the Stiller-Smith Mechanism, one with a toothed belt drive from the input to the output gear and one with a combined belt and gear drive, with an endless belt wrapped around the intermeshed input and output gears. These appear to ignore the different properties of a gear drive and a belt drive.
  Stiller recounts that he had for some time been fascinated by a “do-nothing machine”, a toy based on the double-slider mechanism, and was sure it could be used in an engine.. The Baker-Cross IC-engine of 1974 and Parsons' steam engine of 1877 both used a double-slider crank mechanism.
  In an interview in 1987, Smith mentions a gear train with two gears that converts the reciprocating motion of the pistons to rotary motion, and praises Stiller as a brilliant inventor. In an interview in 1988, he discloses full details of the gear train, and explains that he got the idea from a Spirograph, a toy for drawing patterns that uses a fixed ring gear and a moving spur gear. The gear train has only spur gears, all of which move. The gear train became the subject of Prof. Smith's dissertation and kick-started his career.
  In a paper, Smith et al. used elaborate mathematical calculations to derive parameters for the gear train, but with equivocal results, so that, in the end, it was decided to use round gears, and the piston pins (430 and 432) would be located symmetrically either side of the trammel gear centre (434). The paper does not explain how the characteristics of the gear train match those of the elliptical input motion from the double-slider mechanism and those of the rotary motion required by the output shaft, and how they allow one motion to be converted to the other.
  The Mechanism was used in two experimental 4-cylinder cruciform engines designed and built at West Virginia University, accompanied by much publicity. 175 companies signed non-disclosure agreements to be able to view the engine. Vice-President George Bush was set to pay a brief visit to West Virginia University on 3 May 1988 to see research work including the Stiller-Smith engine project.
  The engine was expected to be suitable for the use of ceramic materials to achieve adiabatic combustion at much higher temperatures than in conventional engines, which would enable the use of heavy fuels if diesel fuel was scarce. This, and the prospect of a high-performance engine for heavy vehicles, raised the interest of the Army which awarded the University a million-dollar development contract, as reported in 1987. However, most of the work was theoretical, centring on computer simulations and analyses of the kinematics and expected forces and loads in the Mechanism, which spawned a string of technical reports and conference papers.
  On 13 November 1989 the US Congress allocated $1,760,000 for research by the Army into the engine's potential for future combat vehicles.

== Gallery ==
=== Approximate straight-line linkages ===
Parts/links of the same color are the same dimensions.

Watt's linkage

Watts parallel-motion linkage

Evans "Grasshopper" linkage

Roberts linkage

Chebyshev linkage

Chebyshev lambda linkage

Chebyshev table linkage

Hoecken's linkage

=== Perfect straight-line linkages ===
Parts/links of the same color are the same dimensions.

Sarrus linkage (Bars variant)

Sarrus linkage (Plates variant)

Peaucellier-Lipkin inversor

Harts inversor 1

Harts inversor 2 (Note: Linkage has unstable positions that are not accounted for. Mitigations for said unstable positions are not shown for the sake of clarity.)

Perrolatz inversor

Kempe kite inversor 1

Kempe kite inversor 2

Kempe kite inversor 3

Scott Russell linkage (slider connection)

Scott Russell linkage (connected to Peaucellier-Lipkin linkage)

Bricard inversor

Sylvester-Kempe quadruplanar inversor 1

Sylvester-Kempe quadruplanar inversor 2

Sylvester-Kempe quadruplanar inversor 3

Kumara-Kampling inversor

=== Tusi couple, elliptical motion: versions and inversions ===
Tusi couple (1247) according to the diagrams in the translation of the copy of Tusi's original description: Small circle rolls within large circle.

Tusi couple according to the translation of the copy of Tusi's original description: Circles rotate in same direction, speed ratio 1:2.

Copernicus' (1473-1543) take on the Tusi couple: Direction of rotation and orbit of moving circle are equal and opposite.

Copernicus circle pair with detached circles

Scotch yoke mechanism

Inversion No. 4

Inversion No. 5

Inside-out Tusi couple. The small circle is split into four fixed quadrants. Two 45° arcs of the large circle form the waist of the trammel.

Parsons' mechanism (1877) combines Tusi Inversion No. 2 with an Archimedes trammel. Pistons at A and C balance each other.

Oldham coupling (1821). Slotted ends of two misaligned shafts (black) are coupled by a cross piece (green). Compare with Tusi Inversion No. 4.

Kinematics of the Multiple Fixed Axis Shaft Compound Eccentric (MultiFAZE) mechanism (1982) characterised by parallelograms ABCD.

=== Compound eccentric mechanisms with elliptical motion ===
A spur gear with two teeth rolls inside a ring gear with four teeth: Archimedes, Tusi or Cardano?

Cardano's (1501-1576) hypocyclic gears: the red, green and blue pins reciprocate on diameters of the ring gear.

Three Archimedes (287~212 BC) trammels on a triangular rotor showing the circular orbit of the trammel midpoints.

MultiFAZE mechanism (1982) in a 60° X4 engine with yokes, and rotary counterweights for full balance.

MultiFAZE mechanism (1982) in a 90° X4 engine with crossheads, trammel gears, and reciprocating balance weights/sliders.

Stiller-Smith 90° X4 2T floating cantilever crank engine (1984) with MultiFAZE eccentric gear train (1982) and double-slider mechanism (ancient).

Stiller-Smith 90° X4 2T floating cantilever crank engine (1984) minus output shafts, 3/4 view

Balandin MB4 cruciform engine with an eccentric crankshaft, 1930's. From a drawing with enigmatic flywheels and no pistons.

MultiFAZE HiSSS fully balanced steam engine

MultiFAZE mechanism in a flat-4 engine

== See also ==
- Four-bar linkage
- Linkage (mechanical)
- Rigid chain actuator
