= Overconstrained mechanism =

Moveable linkage with zero mobility

Trammel of Archimedes with three sliders.

In mechanical engineering, an overconstrained mechanism is a linkage that has more degrees of freedom than is predicted by the mobility formula. The mobility formula evaluates the degree of freedom of a system of rigid bodies that results when constraints are imposed in the form of joints between the links.

If the links of the system move in three-dimensional space, then the mobility formula is

$$M=6(N-1-j)+\sum_{i=1}^j f_i,$$

where N is the number of links in the system, j is the number of joints, and f_{i} is the degree of freedom of the ith joint.

If the links in the system move planes parallel to a fixed plane, or in concentric spheres about a fixed point, then the mobility formula is

$$M=3(N-1-j)+\sum_{i=1}^j f_i.$$

If a system of links and joints has mobility M = 0 or less, yet still moves, then it is called an overconstrained mechanism.

== Reason of over-constraint ==
The reason of over-constraint is the unique geometry of linkages in these mechanisms, which the mobility formula does not take into account. This unique geometry gives rise to "redundant constraints", i.e. when multiple joints are constraining the same degrees of freedom. These redundant constraints are the reason of the over-constraint.

For example, consider a hinged door with 3 hinges. The mobility criterion for this door gives the mobility to be −1. Yet, the door moves and has a degree of freedom 1, as all its hinges have co-linear axes.

== Examples of over-constrained mechanisms ==
=== Multi-hinged doors and the like ===
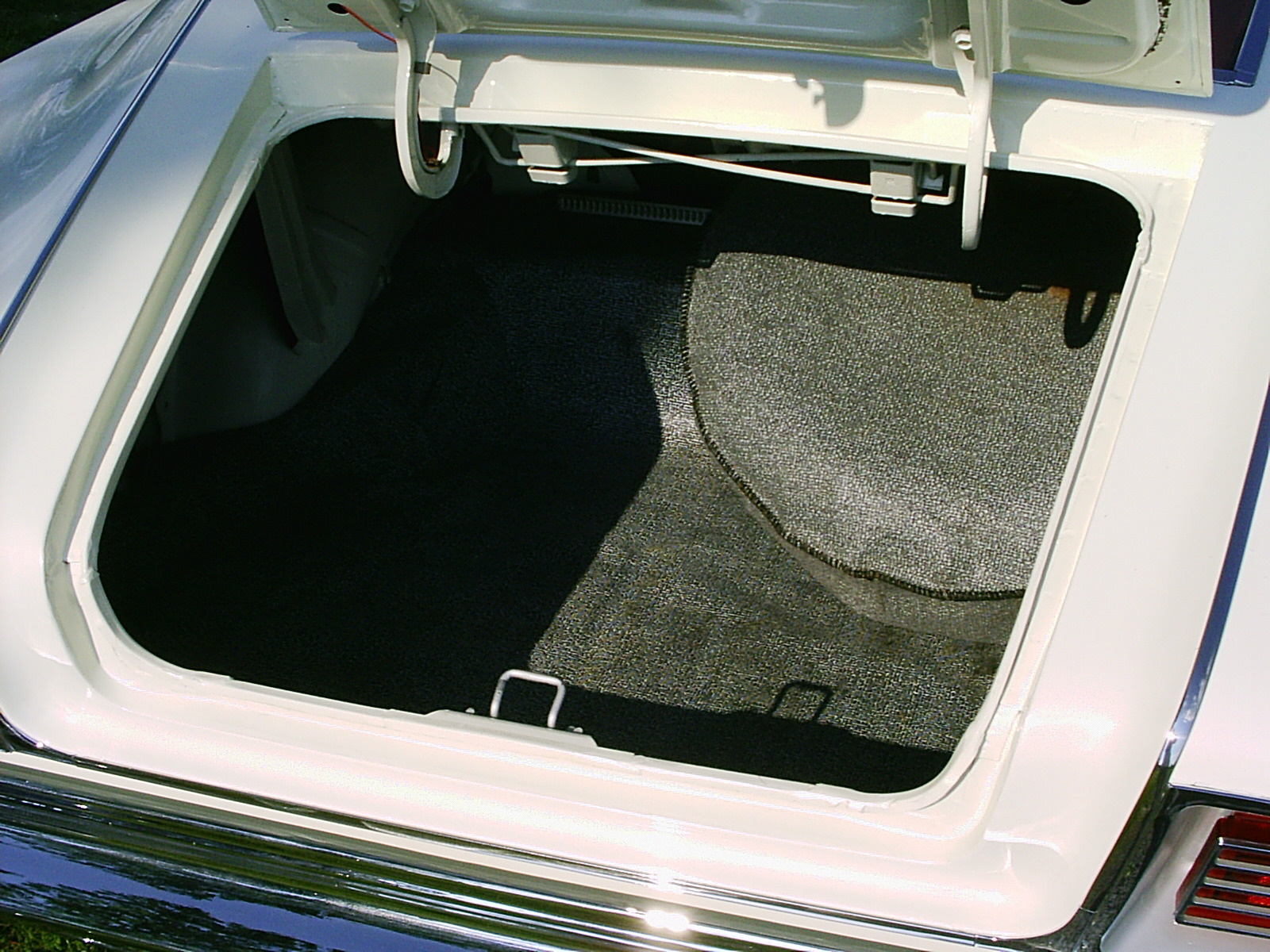
A multi-hinged door is an over-constrained mechanism.

The figure on the left shows a two-hinged trunk lid. The calculated mobility for the lid relative to the car body is zero, yet it moves as its hinges (which are pin joints) have co-linear axes. In this case, the second hinge is kinematically redundant.

=== Parallel linkage ===
A well-known example of an overconstrained mechanism is the parallel linkage with multiple cranks, as seen in the running gear of steam locomotives.

=== Sarrus linkage ===
A Sarrus linkage.

Sarrus mechanism consists of six bars connected by six hinged joints.

A general spatial linkage formed from six links and six hinged joints has mobility

$$M = 6(N - 1 - j) + \sum_{i=1}^j f_i = 6(6-1-6) + 6 = 0,$$

and is therefore a structure.

The Sarrus mechanism has one degree of freedom whereas the mobility formula yields M = 0, which means it has a particular set of dimensions that allow movement.

=== Bennett's linkage ===
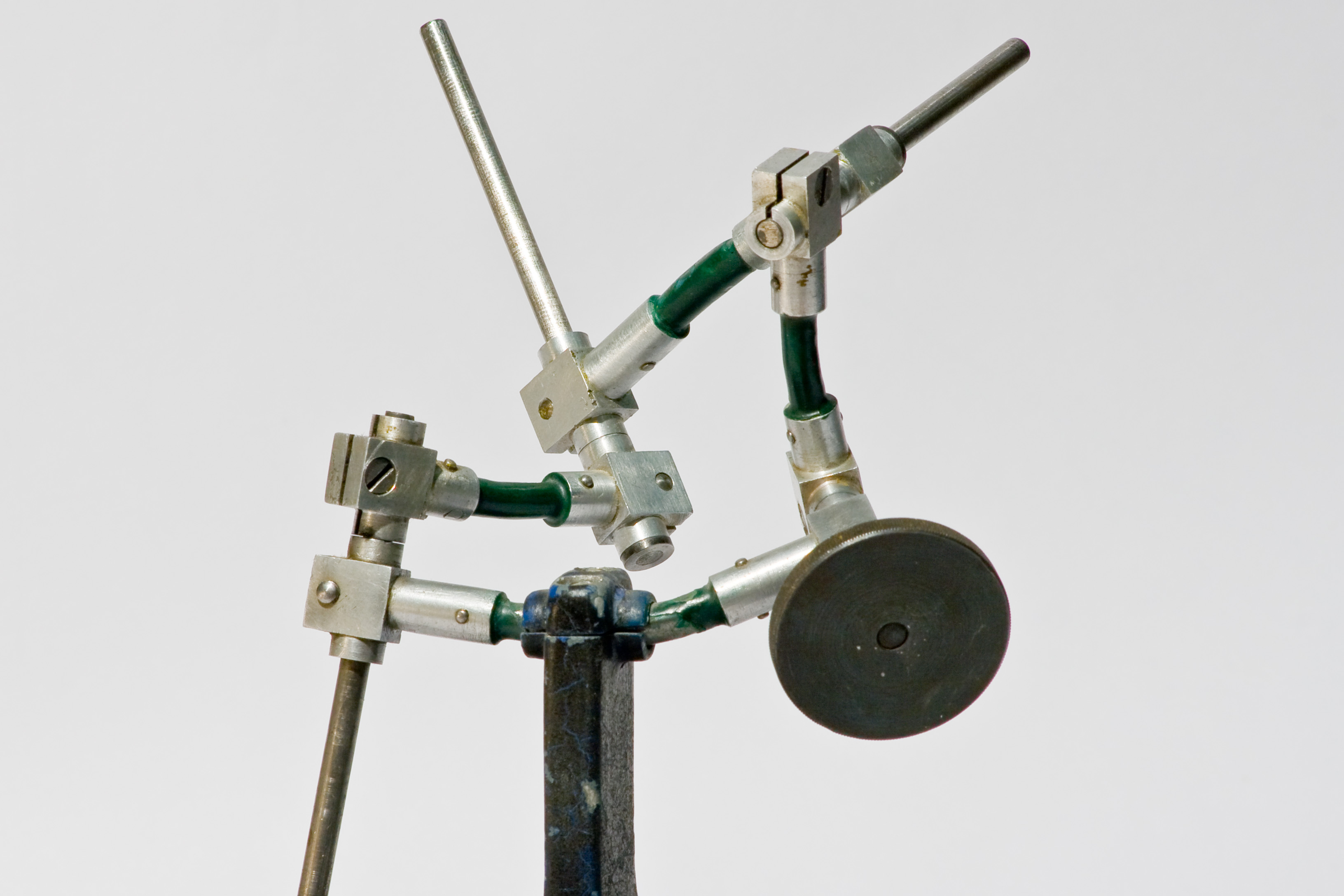
A Bennett's linkage

Another example of an overconstrained mechanism is Bennett's linkage, invented by Geoffrey Thomas Bennett in 1903, which consists of four links connected by four revolute joints.

A general spatial linkage formed from four links and four hinged joints has mobility

$$M = 6(N - 1 - j) + \sum_{i=1}^j f_i = 6(4-1-4) + 4 = -2,$$

which is a highly constrained system.

As in the case of the Sarrus linkage, it is a particular set of dimensions that makes the Bennett linkage movable.

The dimensional constraints that makes Bennett's linkage movable are the following. Let us number the links in order that links with consecutive index are joined (first and fourth links are also joined). For the i-th link, let us denote by d_{i} and a_{i} respectively the distance and the oriented angle of the axes of the revolute joints of the link. Bennett's linkage must satisfies the following constraints:

$$\begin{align}
&d_1 = d_3, \quad a_1 = a_3\\
&d_2 = d_4, \quad a_2 = a_4\\
&\frac{d_1^2}{\sin^2a_1} = \frac{d_2^2}{\sin^2a_2}.
\end{align}$$

Moreover, the links are assembled in such a way that, for two links that are joined, the common perpendicular to the joint axes of the first link intersects the common perpendicular of the joint axes of the second link.

Below is an external link to an animation of a Bennett's linkage.

=== Geometric interpretation ===
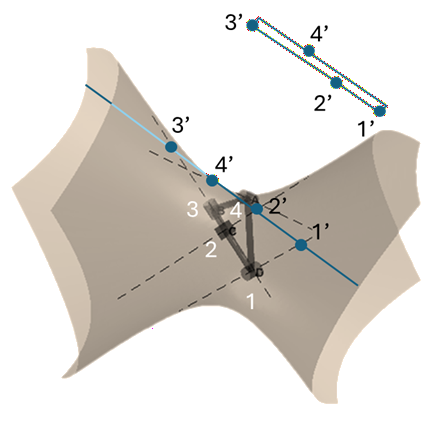
Bennett's mechanism and its associated regulus in a given configuration. The four revolute axes lie on one ruling family of a hyperboloid of one sheet. Any line from the conjugate ruling family intersects all four axes; however, the order of intersection changes (1,2,3,4) → (1′,2′,4′,3′). This produces an equivalent folded configuration of the mechanism, which retains a finite degree of freedom and allows continuous motion to nearby configurations.

A geometric interpretation of Bennett's linkage can be given in terms of ruled surfaces. In particular, the four revolute axes of a Bennett linkage lie on one family of rulings of a hyperboloid of one sheet. As the linkage moves, the associated hyperboloid changes continuously, but remains a hyperboloid of one sheet.

Each hyperboloid of one sheet has two families of straight-line rulings. The joint axes of the Bennett linkage belong to one family, while the other family consists of lines intersecting all four axes. However, unlike certain rigid overconstrained linkages, the intersection points are not ordered monotonically along such a transversal line. In this sense, the corresponding aligned form of the Bennett linkage is folded rather than ordered, which prevents the locking that occurs in some other aligned overconstrained mechanisms.

This viewpoint helps explain why Bennett's linkage remains mobile even though the classical Chebyshev–Grübler–Kutzbach criterion predicts negative mobility: the special geometry of the joint axes creates a dependent screw system, allowing one degree of freedom despite the apparent overconstraint.

=== Watt steam engine ===
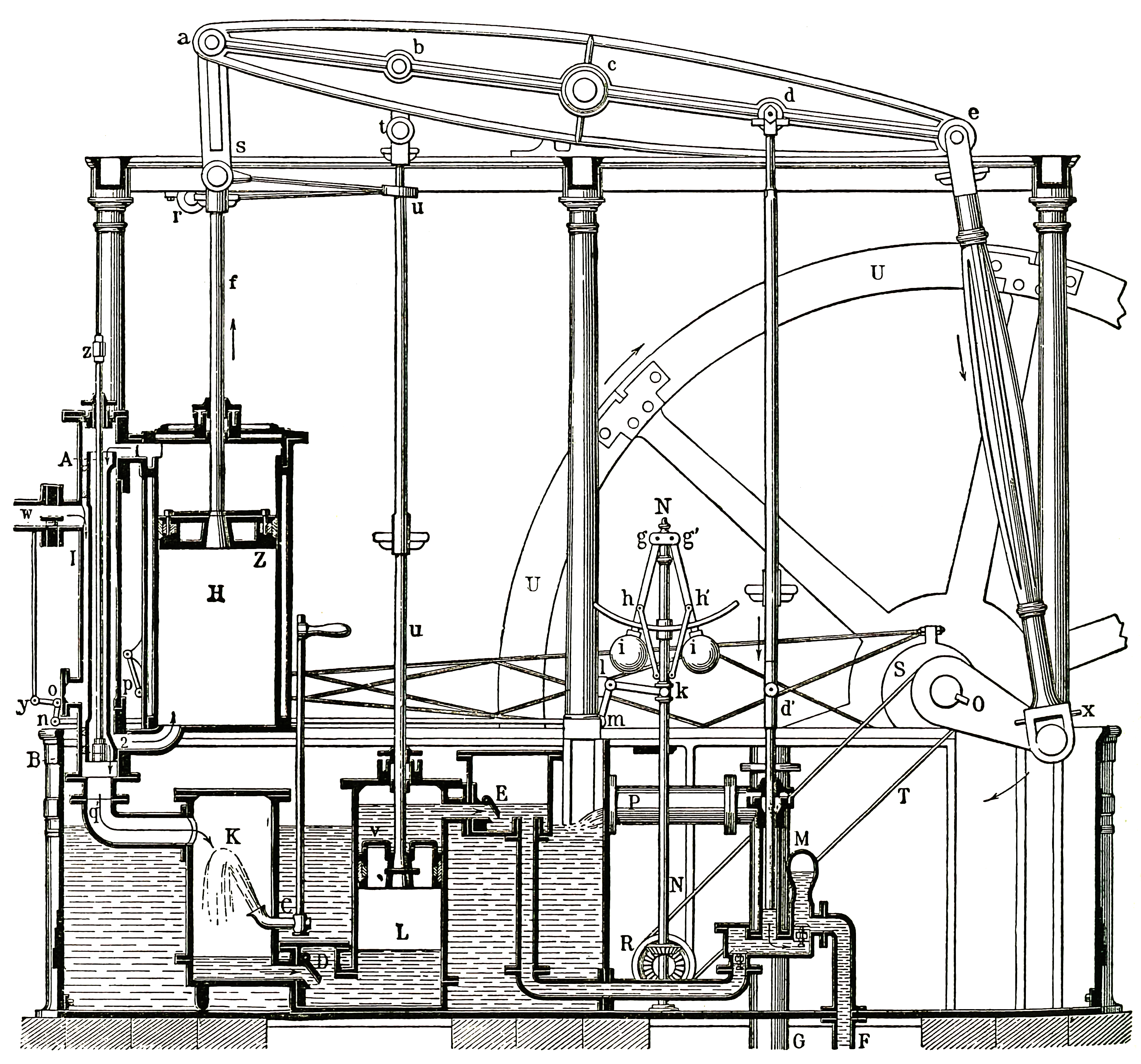
Watt steam engine.

James Watt employed an approximate straight line four-bar linkage to maintain a near rectilinear motion of the piston rod, thus eliminating the need of using a crosshead.

=== Hoberman mechanism ===
Same as the crank-driven elliptic trammel, Hoberman mechanisms move because of their particular geometric configurations.

== Assembly of cognate linkages ==
Overconstrained mechanisms can be also obtained by assembling together cognate linkages; when their number is more than two, overconstrained mechanisms with negative calculated mobility will result. The companion animated GIFs show overconstrained mechanisms obtained by assembling together four-bar coupler cognates and function cognates of the Watt II type.

3R-R-3R Watt II function cognates.

3R-P-3R Watt II function cognates.
