= Hoecken linkage =

Four-bar straight-line mechanism

Animation of the Hoecken linkage Dimensions (unit length a): Link 2: a Link 3: any multiple of a Link 1 (distance between ground joints): 2a

In kinematics, the Hoecken linkage (named for Karl Hoecken) is a four-bar linkage that converts rotational motion to approximate straight-line motion. The Hoecken linkage is a cognate linkage of the Chebyshev linkage and Chebyshev's Lambda Mechanism.

The linkage was first published in 1926.

A generalization of the Hoecken linkage is Wittgenstein's rod.

== See also ==
- Chebyshev linkage and Chebyshev lambda linkage, linkages that produce a very similar locus without the need of a sliding joint.
- Straight line mechanism
- Four-bar linkage
