= Roberts linkage =

Linkage generating approximate straight line motion

Animation of the Roberts Linkage Dimensions: Green Triangle = a, a, b (a are the longer sides) Yellow Links = a Horizontal Distance between Ground Joints = 2b

A Roberts linkage is a four-bar linkage which converts a rotational motion to approximate straight-line motion.

The linkage was developed by Richard Roberts.

The Roberts linkage can be classified as:

- Watt-type linkage
- Grashof rocker-rocker
- Symmetrical four-bar linkage

== See also ==
- Straight line mechanism
- Four-bar linkage
