= Four-bar linkage =

Mechanical linkage consisting of four links connected by joints in a loop

In the study of mechanisms, a four-bar linkage, also called a four-bar, is the simplest closed-chain movable linkage. It consists of four bodies, called bars or links, connected in a loop by four joints. Generally, the joints are configured so the links move in parallel planes, and the assembly is called a planar four-bar linkage. Spherical and spatial four-bar linkages also exist and are used in practice.

A pumpjack's main mechanism is a four-bar linkage

== Planar four-bar linkage ==
Planar four-bar linkages are constructed from four links connected in a loop by four one-degree-of-freedom joints. A joint may be either a revolute joint – also known as a pin joint or hinged joint – denoted by R, or a prismatic joint – also known as a sliding pair – denoted by P. (Note: Sometimes, it is also denoted as 'S' to refer to slider, rather than a prismatic joint.)

A link that is fixed in place relative to the viewer is called a ground link.
A link connecting to the ground by a revolute joint that can perform a complete revolution is called a crank link.
A link connecting to the ground by a revolute joint that cannot perform a complete revolution is called a rocker link.
A link connecting to a ground line by a prismatic joint is called a slider. Sliders are sometimes considered to be cranks that have a hinged pivot at an infinitely long distance away perpendicular to the travel of the slider.
A link connecting to two other links is called a floating link or coupler. A coupler connecting a crank and a slider in a single slider crank mechanism is often called a connecting rod, however, it has also been used to refer to any type of coupler.

There are three basic types of planar four-bar linkage, depending on the use of revolute or prismatic joints:

1. Four revolute joints:
  It is denoted as RRRR, constructed from four links connected by four revolute joints. The planar quadrilateral linkage refers to all arrangements in this type.
  Examples of 4R linkages include:
  - Double-crank linkage
  - Crank-rocker (Treadle) linkage (used in pumpjacks)
  - Double-rocker linkage (used in Ackermann steering)
  - Parallelogram (Parallel Motion (Note: This is not to be confused with Watt's Parallel Motion linkage.)) and Antiparallelogram (Contraparallelogram, Inverse Parallelogram, Butterfly, Bow-tie) linkages
  - Deltoid (Galloway) and Trapezium (Arglin) linkages
2. Three revolute joints:
  It is denoted as RRRP, PRRR, RPRR, or RRPR, constructed from four links connected by three revolute joints and one prismatic joint. The slider-crank linkage (RRRP) is one type of arrangement such that one link is a crank, which is then connected to a slider by a connecting rod. The inverted slider-crank is another type of arrangement such that there are two cranks with a slider acting as the coupler.
  Examples of 3R1P linkages include:
  - Single-slider crank mechanism (used in internal combustion engines)
  - Whitworth Quick Return mechanism (used in early types of shapers)
  - Crank and slotted lever Quick Return mechanism (used in shapers)
  - Fixed piston mechanism (used in hand pumps)
3. Two revolute joints and two prismatic joints:
  It is denoted as PRRP, and is constructed by connecting two sliders with a coupler link. The doubler slider refers to all arrangements in this type.
  Examples of 2R2P linkages include:
  - Trammel of Archimedes (Elliptical trammel)
  - Scotch yoke (slotted link) mechanism (used in valve actuators)
  - Oldham's coupling

Planar four-bar linkages can be designed to guide a wide variety of movements, and are often the base mechanisms found in many machines. Because of this, the kinematics and dynamics of planar four-bar linkages are also important topics in mechanical engineering.

== Planar quadrilateral linkage ==
Planar quadrilateral linkages, RRRR or 4R linkages have four rotating joints. One link of the chain is usually fixed, and is called the ground link, fixed link, or the frame. The two links connected to the frame are called the grounded links and are generally the input and output links of the system, sometimes called the input link and output link. The last link is the floating link, which is also called a coupler or connecting rod because it connects an input to the output.

Assuming the frame is horizontal there are four possibilities for the input and output links:

- A crank: can rotate a full 360 degrees
- A rocker: can rotate through a limited range of angles which does not include 0° or 180°
- A 0-rocker: can rotate through a limited range of angles which includes 0° but not 180°
- A π-rocker: can rotate through a limited range of angles which includes 180° but not 0°

Some authors do not distinguish between the types of rocker.

=== Grashof condition ===
The Grashof condition for a four-bar linkage states:

If the sum of the shortest and longest link of a planar quadrilateral linkage is less than or equal to the sum of the remaining two links, then the shortest link can rotate fully with respect to a neighboring link.

In other words, the condition is satisfied if S + L ≤ P + Q, where S is the shortest link, L is the longest, and P and Q are the other links.

=== Classification ===
The movement of a quadrilateral linkage can be classified into eight cases based on the dimensions of its four links. Let a, b, g, and h denote the lengths of the input crank, the output crank, the ground link and floating link, respectively. Then, we can construct the three terms:
$$\begin{align}
T_1 &= g + h - a - b, \\[2pt]
T_2 &= b + g - a - h, \\[2pt]
T_3 &= b + h - a - g.
\end{align}$$

The movement of a quadrilateral linkage can be classified into eight types based on the positive and negative values for these three terms, T_{1}, T_{2}, and T_{3}.

$T_1$	$T_2$	$T_3$	Grashof condition	Input link	Output link
−	−	+	Grashof	Crank	Crank
+	+	+	Grashof	Crank	Rocker
+	−	−	Grashof	Rocker	Crank
−	+	−	Grashof	Rocker	Rocker
−	−	−	Non-Grashof	0-Rocker	0-Rocker
−	+	+	Non-Grashof	π-Rocker	π-Rocker
+	−	+	Non-Grashof	π-Rocker	0-Rocker
+	+	−	Non-Grashof	0-Rocker	π-Rocker

The cases of T_{1} = 0, T_{2} = 0, and T_{3} = 0 are interesting because the linkages fold. If we distinguish folding quadrilateral linkage, then there are 27 different cases.

The figure shows examples of the various cases for a planar quadrilateral linkage.

Types of four-bar linkages, s: shortest link, l: longest link.

The configuration of a quadrilateral linkage may be classified into three types: convex, concave, and crossing. In the convex and concave cases no two links cross over each other. In the crossing linkage two links cross over each other. In the convex case all four internal angles are less than 180 degrees, and in the concave configuration one internal angle is greater than 180 degrees. There exists a simple geometrical relationship between the lengths of the two diagonals of the quadrilateral. For convex and crossing linkages, the length of one diagonal increases if and only if the other decreases. On the other hand, for nonconvex non-crossing linkages, the opposite is the case; one diagonal increases if and only if the other also increases.

== Design of four-bar mechanisms ==
The synthesis, or design, of four-bar mechanisms is important when aiming to produce a desired output motion for a specific input motion. In order to minimize cost and maximize efficiency, a designer will choose the simplest mechanism possible to accomplish the desired motion. When selecting a mechanism type to be designed, link lengths must be determined by a process called dimensional synthesis. Dimensional synthesis involves an iterate-and-analyze methodology which in certain circumstances can be an inefficient process; however, in unique scenarios, exact and detailed procedures to design an accurate mechanism may not exist.

=== Time ratio ===
The time ratio (Q) of a four-bar mechanism is a measure of its quick return and is defined as follows:

$$Q = \frac{\text{Time of slower stroke}}{\text{Time of quicker stroke}} \ge 1$$

With four-bar mechanisms there are two strokes, the forward and return, which when added together create a cycle. Each stroke may be identical or have different average speeds. The time ratio numerically defines how fast the forward stroke is compared to the quicker return stroke. The total cycle time (Δt_{cycle}) for a mechanism is:

$$\Delta t_\text{cycle} = \text{Time of slower stroke} + \text{Time of quicker stroke}$$

Most four-bar mechanisms are driven by a rotational actuator, or crank, that requires a specific constant speed. This required speed (ω_{crank}) is related to the cycle time as follows:

$$\omega_\text{crank} = (\Delta t_\text{cycle})^{-1}$$

Some mechanisms that produce reciprocating, or repeating, motion are designed to produce symmetrical motion. That is, the forward stroke of the machine moves at the same pace as the return stroke. These mechanisms, which are often referred to as in-line design, usually do work in both directions, as they exert the same force in both directions.

Examples of symmetrical motion mechanisms include:

- Windshield wipers
- Engine mechanisms or pistons
- Automobile window crank

Other applications require that the mechanism-to-be-designed has a faster average speed in one direction than the other. This category of mechanism is most desired for design when work is only required to operate in one direction. The speed at which this one stroke operates is also very important in certain machine applications. In general, the return and work-non-intensive stroke should be accomplished as fast as possible. This is so the majority of time in each cycle is allotted for the work-intensive stroke. These quick-return mechanisms are often referred to as offset.

Examples of offset mechanisms include:

- Cutting machines
- Package-moving devices

With offset mechanisms, it is very important to understand how and to what degree the offset affects the time ratio. To relate the geometry of a specific linkage to the timing of the stroke, an imbalance angle (β) is used. This angle is related to the time ratio, Q, as follows:

$$Q = \frac{180^\circ + \beta}{180^\circ - \beta}$$

Through simple algebraic rearrangement, this equation can be rewritten to solve for β:
$$\beta = 180^\circ \times \frac{Q-1}{Q+1}$$

=== Timing charts ===
Timing charts are often used to synchronize the motion between two or more mechanisms. They graphically display information showing where and when each mechanism is stationary or performing its forward and return strokes. Timing charts allow designers to qualitatively describe the required kinematic behavior of a mechanism.

These charts are also used to estimate the velocities and accelerations of certain four-bar links. The velocity of a link is the time rate at which its position is changing, while the link's acceleration is the time rate at which its velocity is changing. Both velocity and acceleration are vector quantities, in that they have both magnitude and direction; however, only their magnitudes are used in timing charts. When used with two mechanisms, timing charts assume constant acceleration. This assumption produces polynomial equations for velocity as a function of time. Constant acceleration allows for the velocity vs. time graph to appear as straight lines, thus designating a relationship between displacement (ΔR), maximum velocity (v_{peak}), acceleration (a), and time (Δt). The following equations show this.
$$\begin{align}
\Delta R &= \frac12 v_\text{peak} \Delta t,\\[4pt]
\Delta R &= \frac14 a (\Delta t)^2 .
\end{align}$$

Given the displacement and time, both the maximum velocity and acceleration of each mechanism in a given pair can be calculated.

== Slider-crank linkage ==
A slider-crank linkage is a four-bar linkage with three revolute joints and one prismatic, or sliding, joint. The rotation of the crank drives the linear movement the slider, or the expansion of gases against a sliding piston in a cylinder can drive the rotation of the crank.

There are two types of slider-cranks: in-line and offset.

In-line
An in-line slider-crank has its slider positioned so the line of travel of the hinged joint of the slider passes through the base joint of the crank. This creates a symmetric slider movement back and forth as the crank rotates.
Offset
If the line of travel of the hinged joint of the slider does not pass through the base pivot of the crank, the slider movement is not symmetric. It moves faster in one direction than the other. This is called a quick-return mechanism.

== Spherical and spatial four-bar linkages ==
If the linkage has four hinged joints with axes angled to intersect in a single point, then the links move on concentric spheres and the assembly is called a spherical four-bar linkage. The input-output equations of a spherical four-bar linkage can be applied to spatial four-bar linkages when the variables are replaced by dual numbers. (Note: Note that the cited conference paper incorrectly conflates Moore-Penrose pseudoinverses with one-sided inverses of matrices, falsely claiming that the latter are unique whenever they exist. This is contradicted by the fact that $(1,0)^T$ admits the set of matrices $\{(1,x) \mid x \in \mathbb C\}$ as all its left inverses.)

Bennett's linkage is a spatial four-bar linkage with hinged joints that have their axes angled in a particular way that makes the system movable.

Universal joint.

Tractor steering

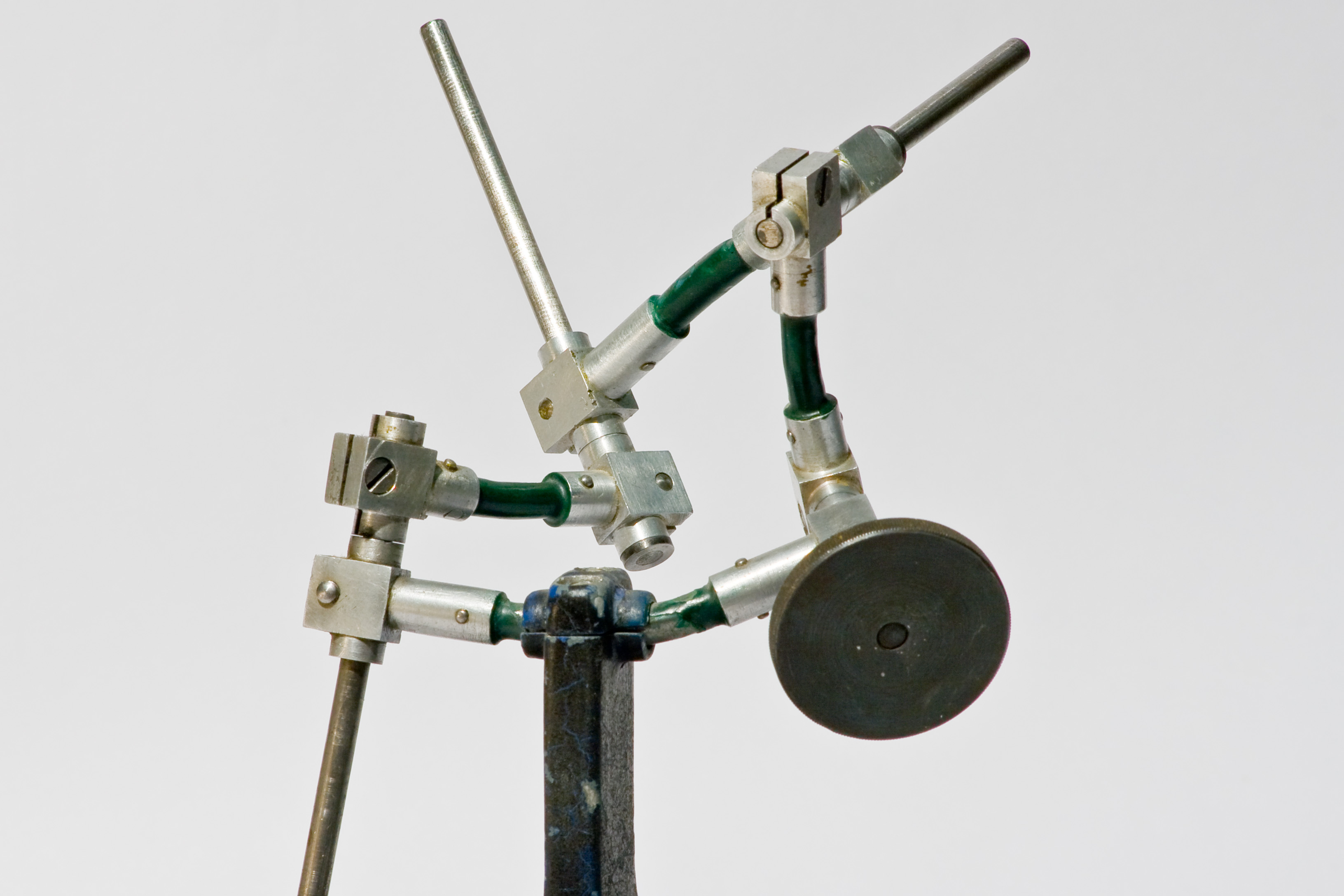
Bennett four-bar linkage.

== Examples ==
=== Other linkages and mechanisms ===
- Chebyshev linkage
- Chebyshev lambda linkage
- Evans "Grasshopper" linkage
- Hoecken linkage
- Horse-head linkage
- Pantograph
- Roberts linkage
- Valve gear
- Watt's linkage

=== Applications ===
- Bicycle suspension
- Biological linkages
- Double-beam drawbridge
- Double wishbone suspension
- Door closer
- Foldable steps and foldable chairs
- Foot operated machines (grindstone, lathe, sewing machine, treadle, etc.)
- Gear shifter
- Glider (furniture)
- Oscillating fan
- Pumpjack
- Step-on trash can
- Windshield wiper
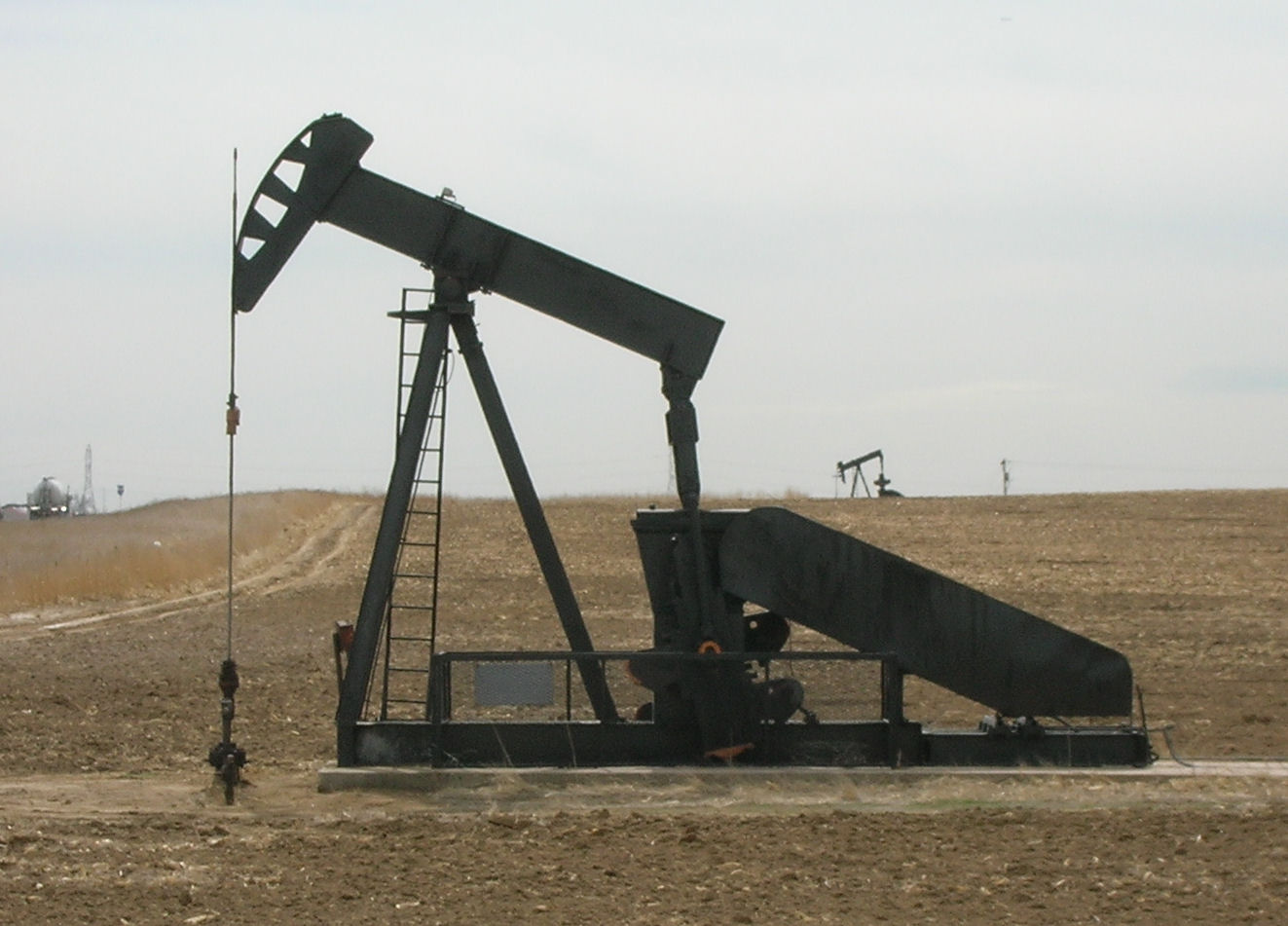
Oil well pump-jack.

Train Suspension using Watt's linkage.

Rear car suspension using Watt's linkage.

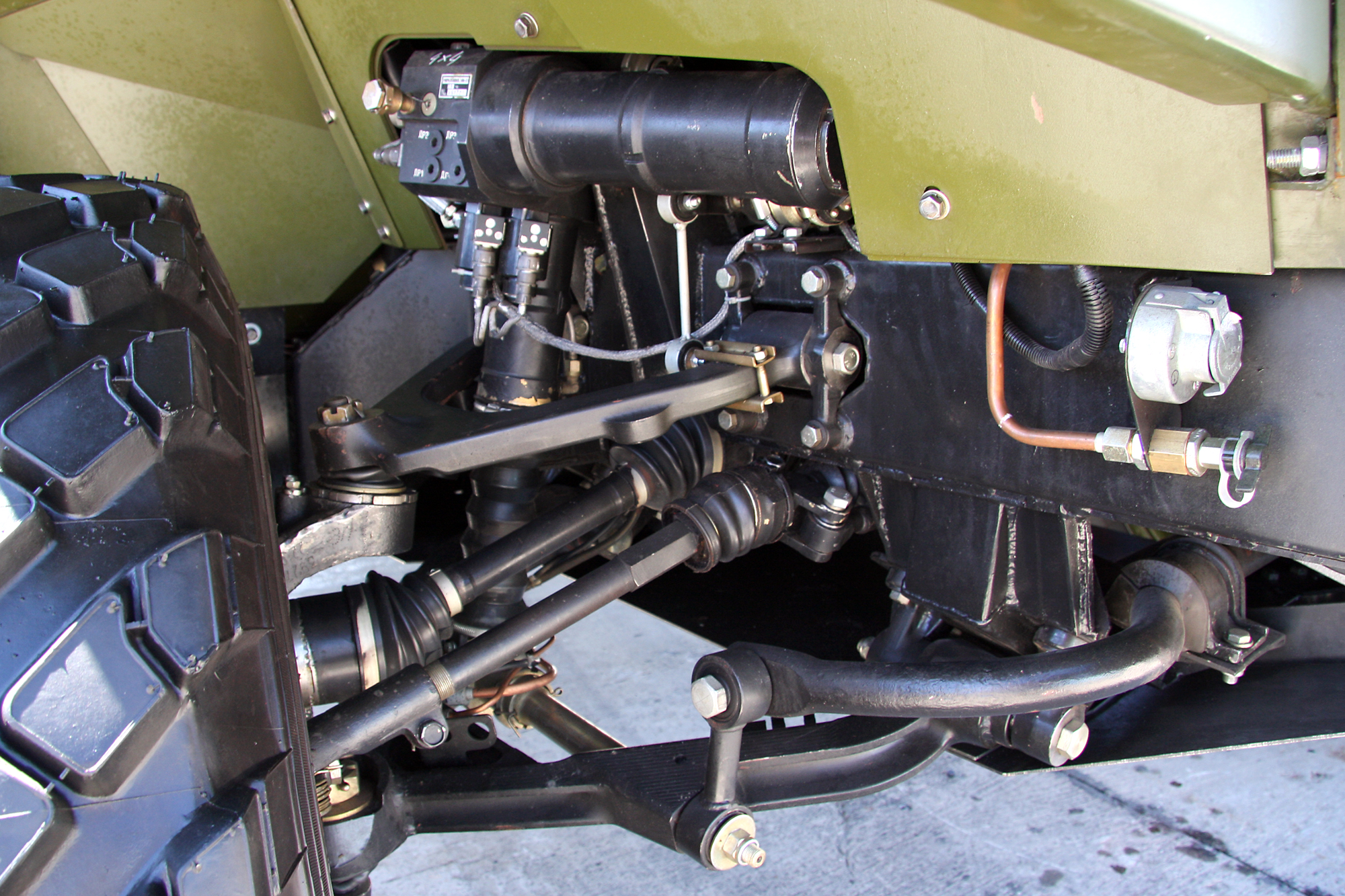
Suspension for VPK-3927 Volk family armored vehicles.

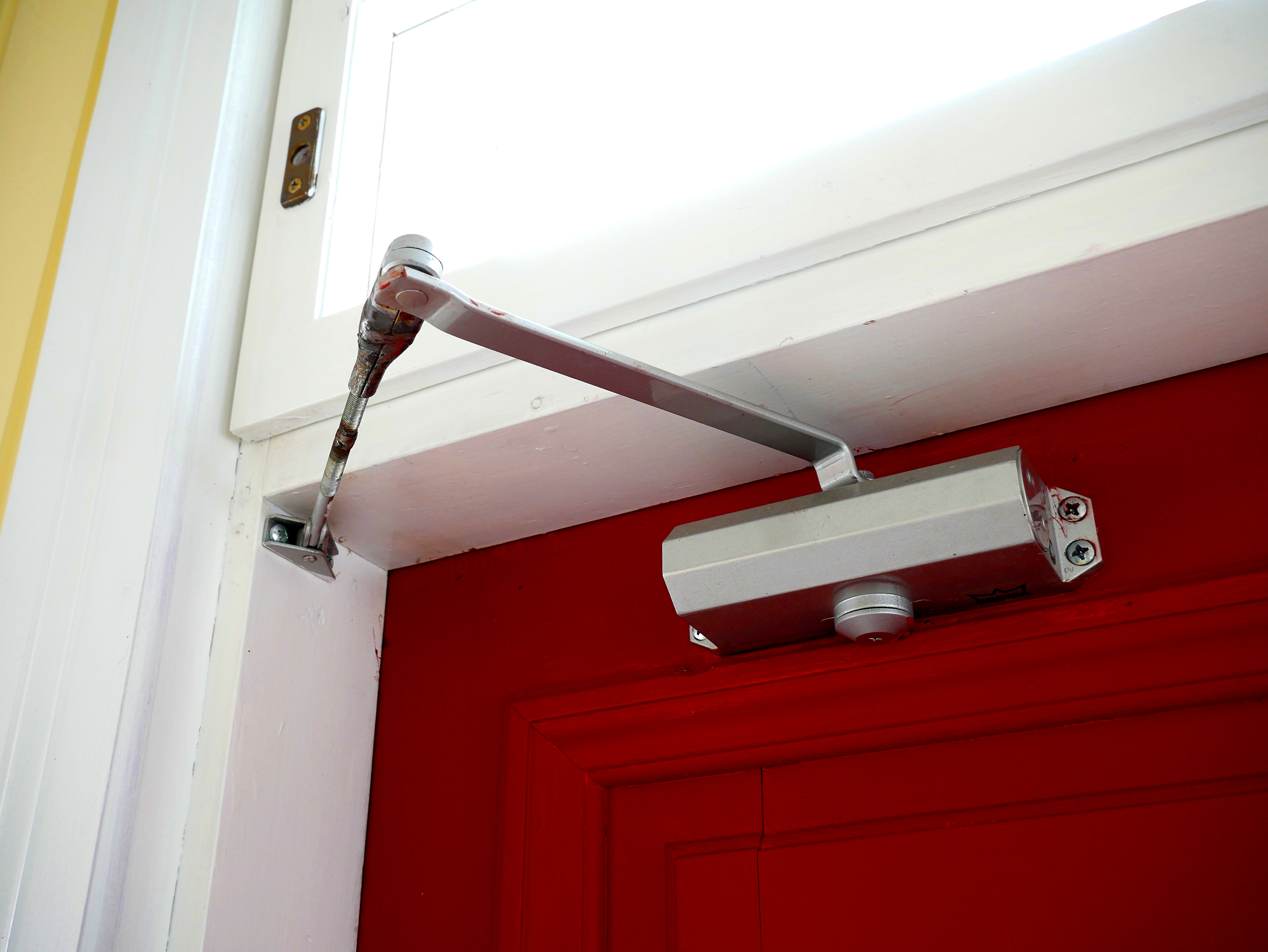
Door closer mechanism.

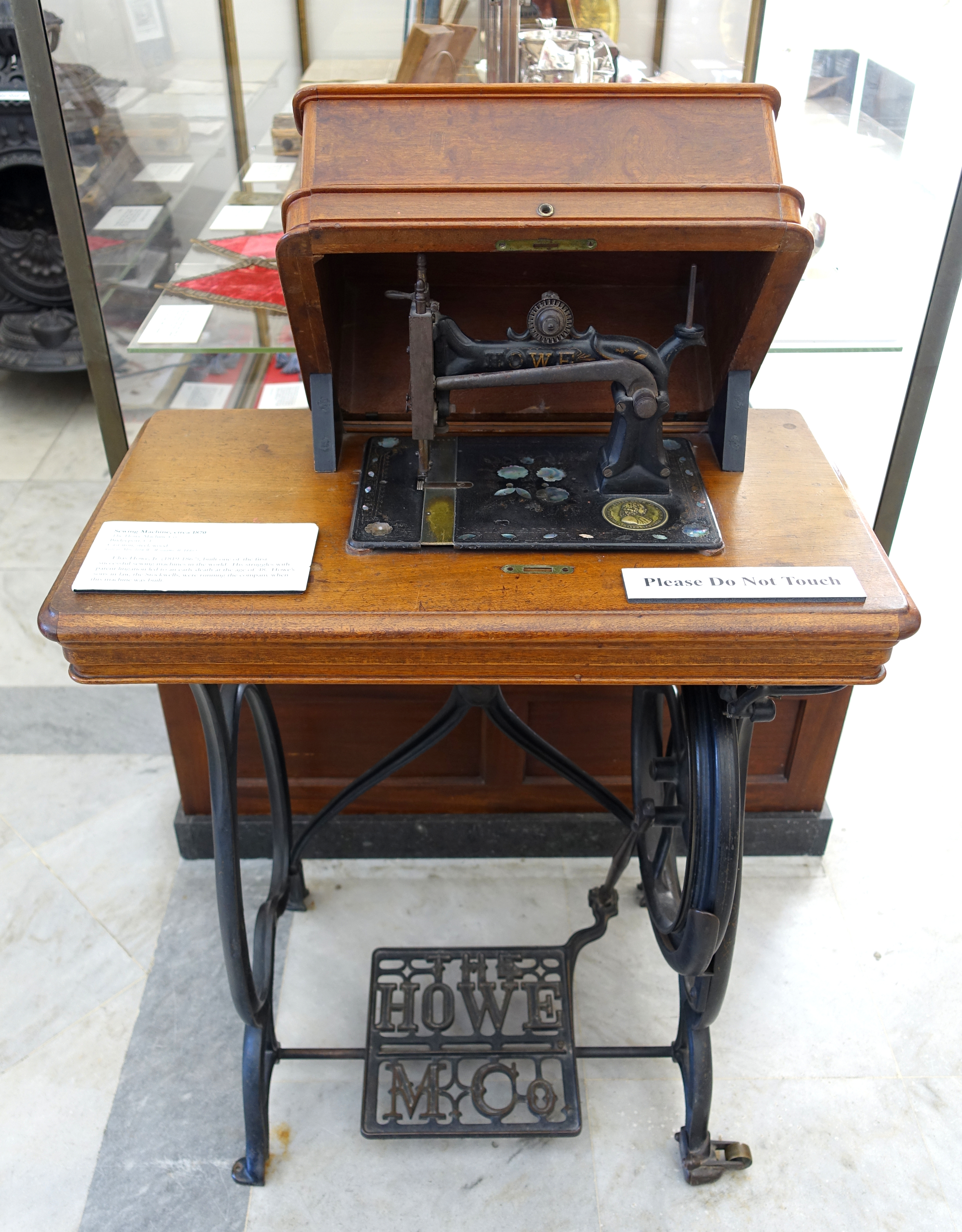
The Howe Machine Co. Sewing machine.

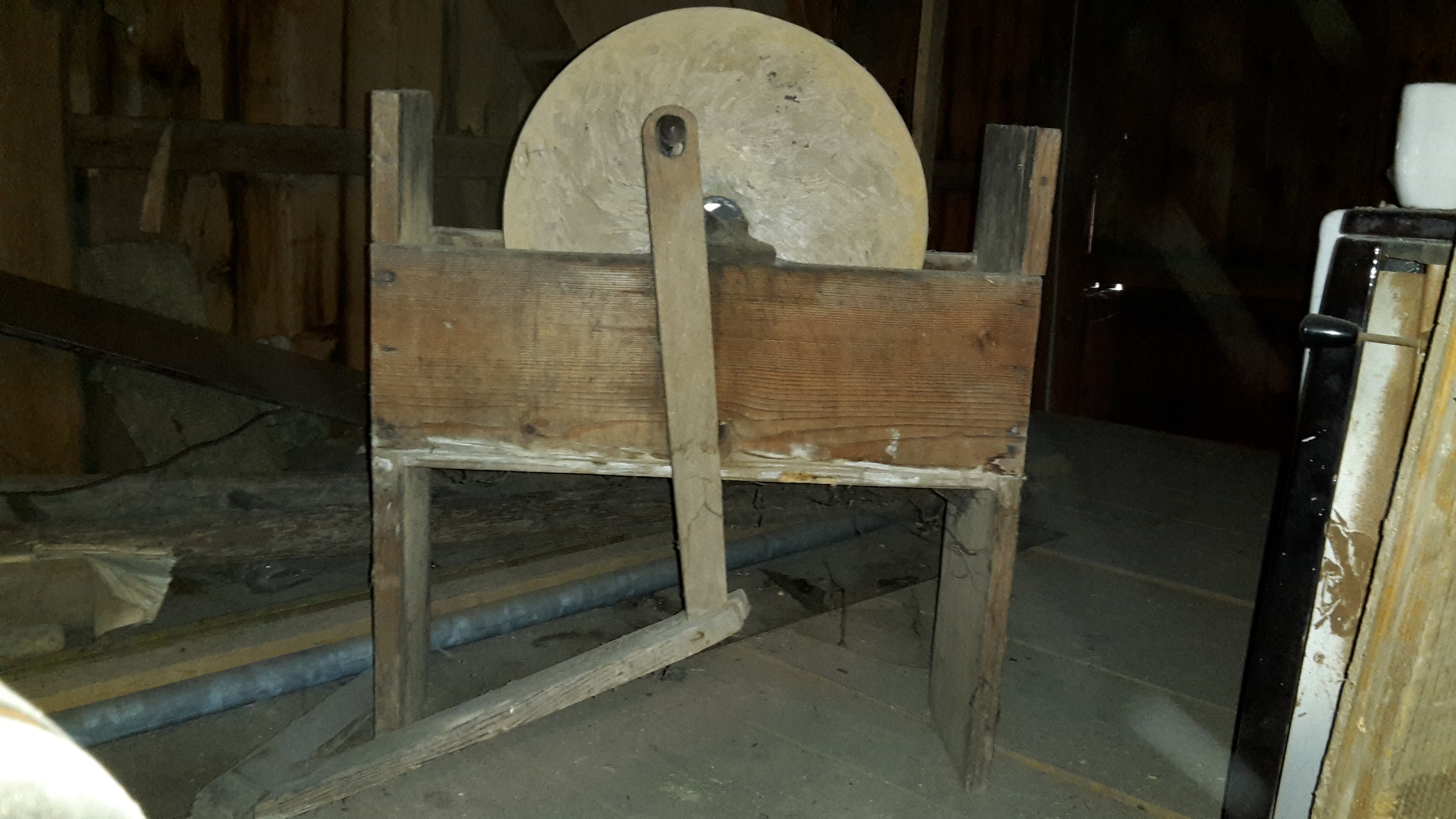
A pedal-driven grindstone.

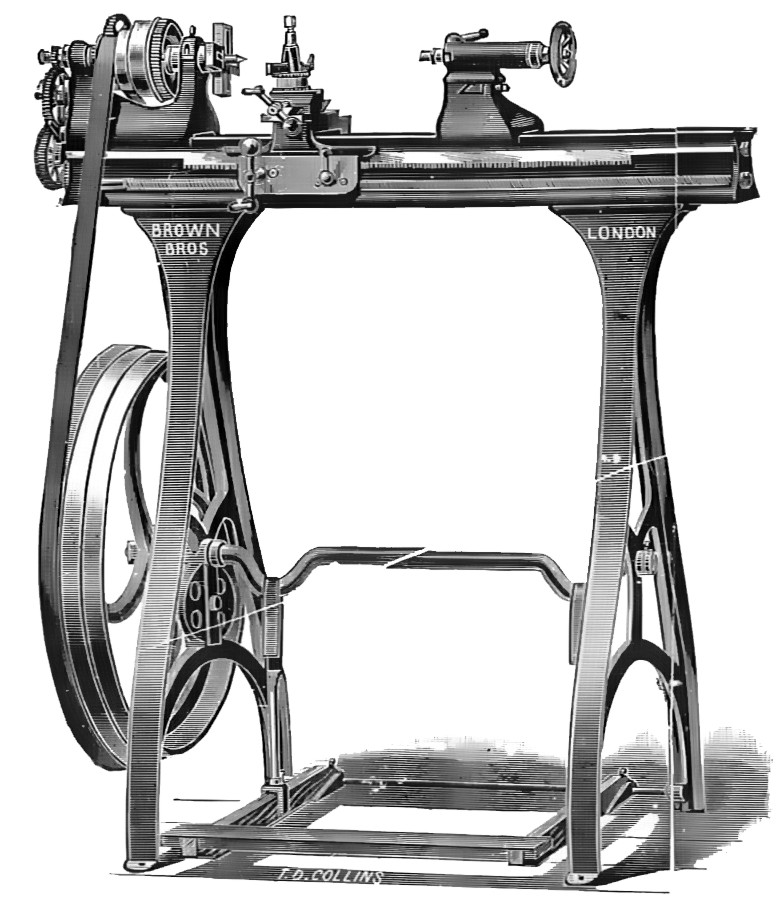
The Brown Bros screwcutting treadle lathe.

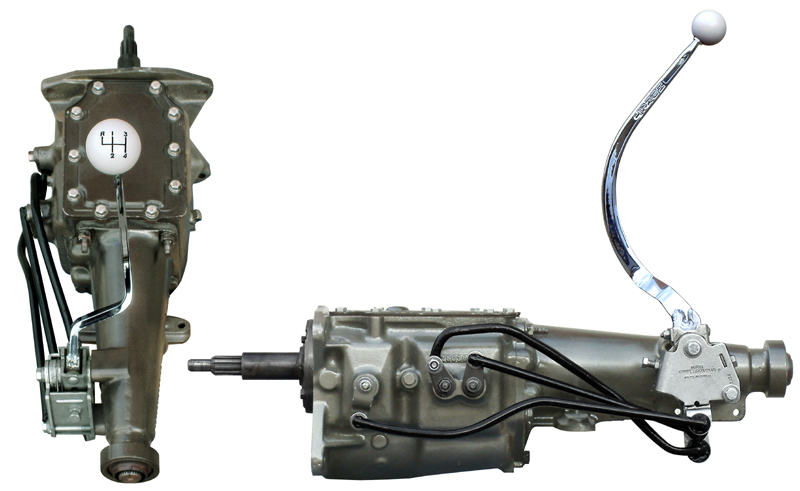
Ford 3-speed Overdrive Transmission

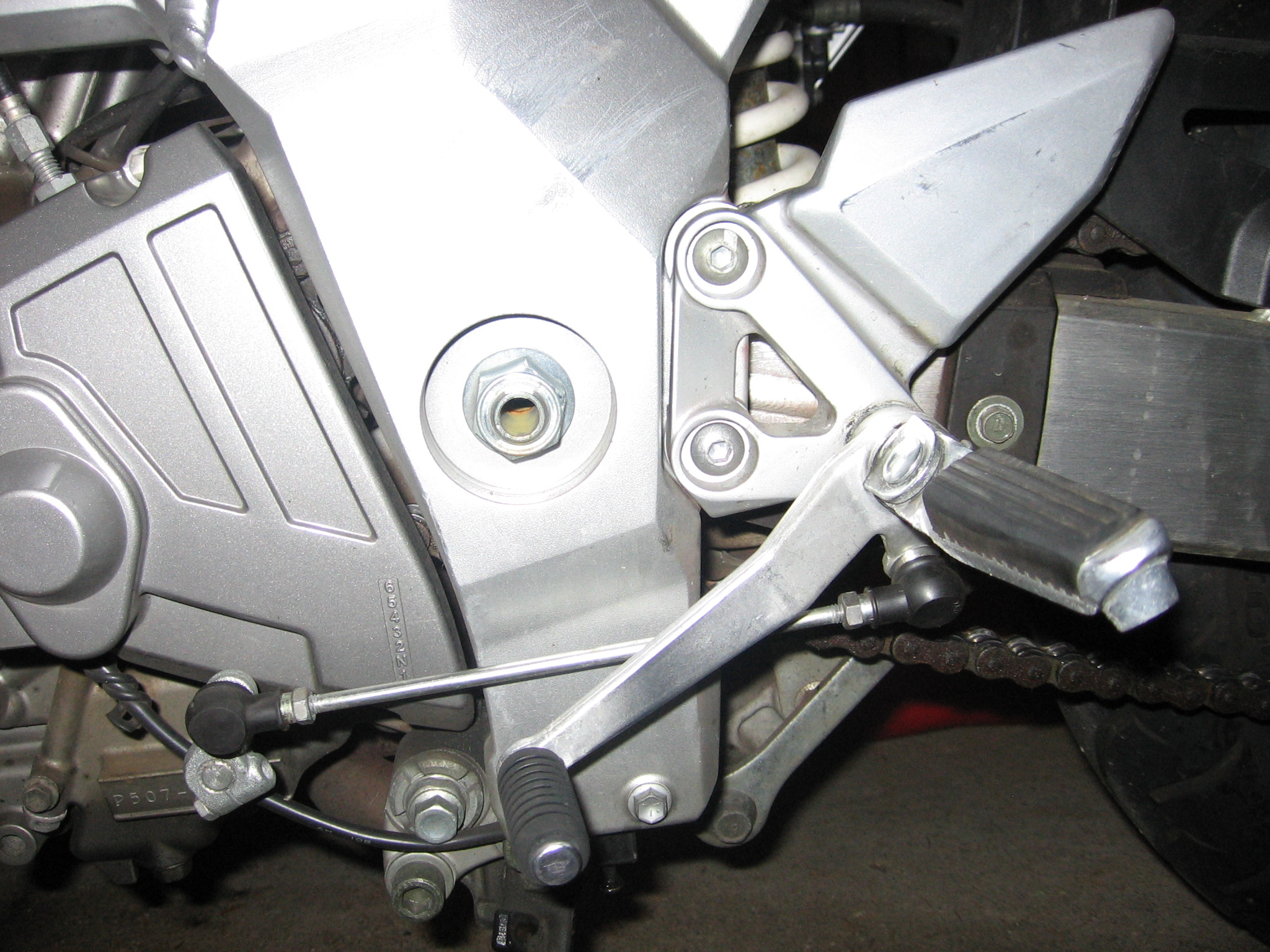
Gearshift on a 2003 SV650S motorcycle.

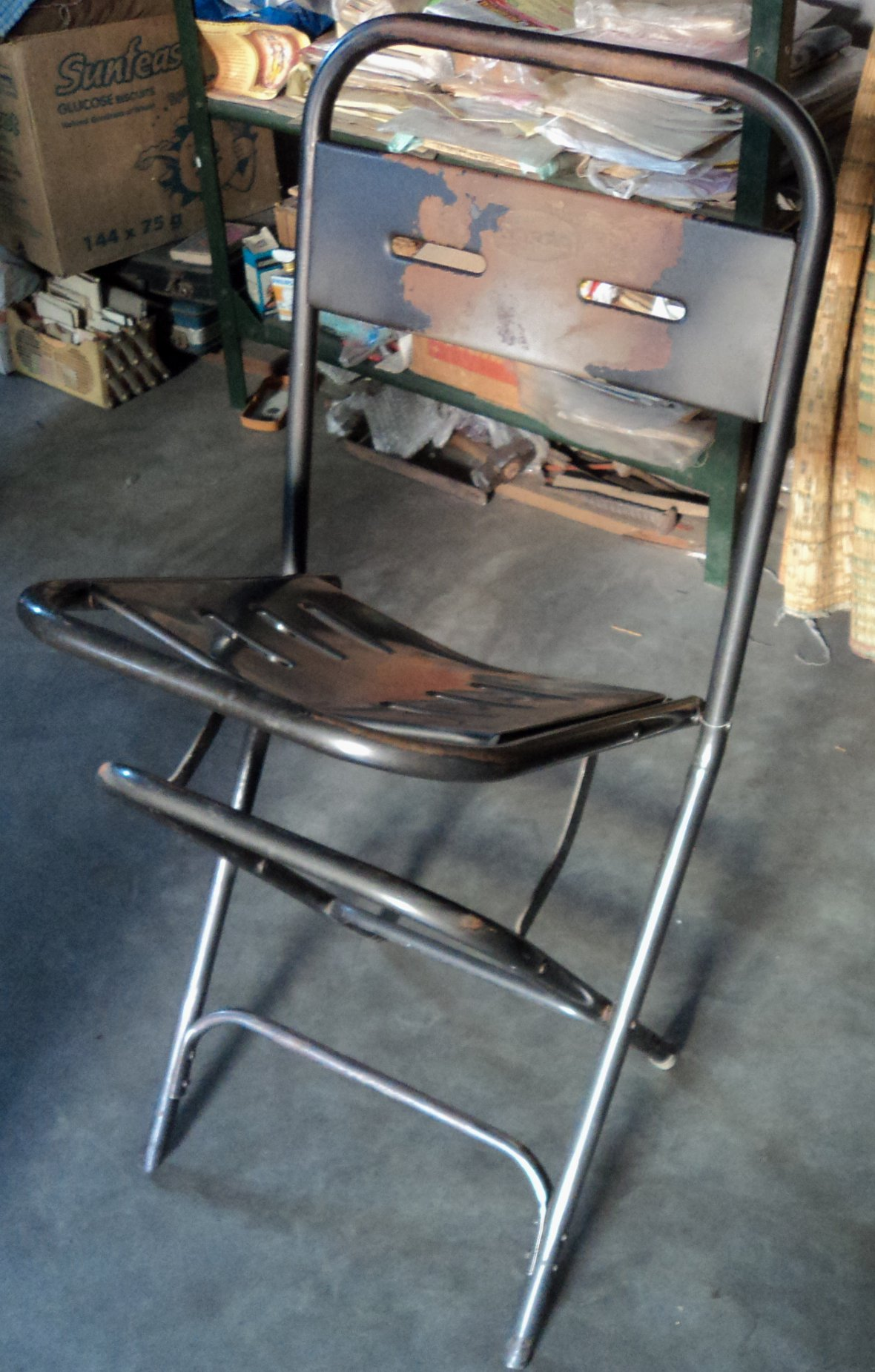
A foldable chair.

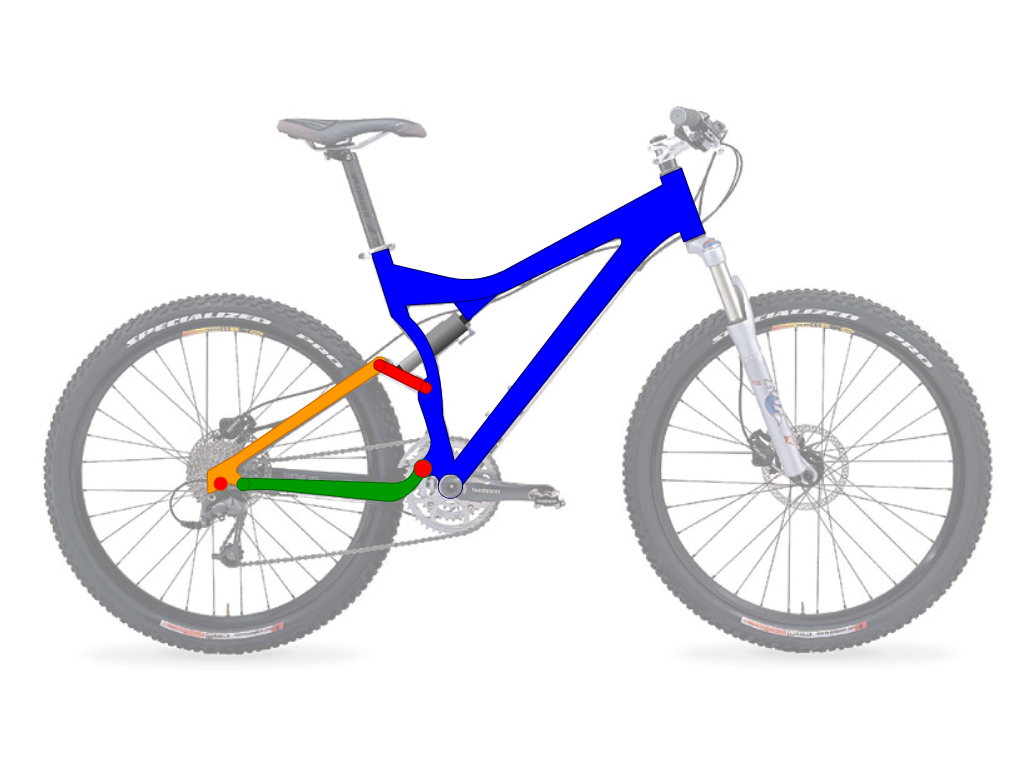
A diagram of the suspension on a Specialized Stumpjumper FSR mountain bike.

Animation of a steam locomotive with Walschaerts valve gear.

== Simulations ==
Crank-Rocker 4-Bar Linkage:
Cyan link completes a full revolution
Green link rocks back and forth.

Double-Crank 4-Bar Linkage
Cyan link completes a full revolution
Green link completes a full revolution.

Double-Rocker 4-Bar Linkage:
Yellow link and Green link rock back and forth.

Parallelogram and Antiparallelogram 4-Bar Linkages:
(Demonstration of Point Change Condition in the Middle)

Parallelogram and Antiparallelogram 4-Bar Linkages (Inversions):
(Demonstration of Point Change Condition in the Middle)

Deltoid/Kite (Galloway) 4-Bar Linkage:
Both inversions shown:
• Crank-Rocker
• Double-Crank

Trapezium (Arglin) 4-Bar Linkage:
All four unique inversions shown:
• Crank-Rocker
• Crank-Rocker
• Double-Crank
• Double-Rocker
Fixed and moving centrodes drawn on a 4-Bar Double-Crank linkage.

== See also ==
- Burmester's theory
- Cognate linkage
- Five-bar linkage
- Kinematic synthesis
- Linkage (mechanical)
- Pumpjack
- Six-bar linkage
- Slider-crank linkage
- Spherical trigonometry
- Straight line mechanism (Approximate straight lines are primarily four-bar linkages)
- Universal joint
