= Scott Russell linkage =

Type of straight line mechanism

Animation of the Scott Russell linkage

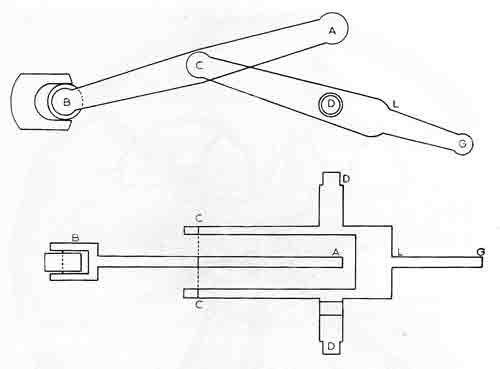
Freemantle straight-line linkage from British Patent 2741, November 17, 1803.

The Scott Russell linkage is a linkage that translates linear motion through a right angle. It is often used in vehicle suspensions.

The linkage is named after John Scott Russell (1808–1882), although watchmaker William Freemantle had already patented it in 1803.

A different form of the linkage has been used in a front-wheel-drive vehicle with solid rear axle to control lateral movement, and with a flexing elastomeric connection instead of the rolling or sliding connection.

The linkage does not share the disadvantages of the asymmetric Panhard rod, and is more compact than the Watt's linkage.

== Construction and related linkages ==
Animation of a Grasshopper Linkage.

Animation of the Scott Russell linkage attached to a Peaucellier-Lipkin Linkage.

Animation of a Bricard Inversor.

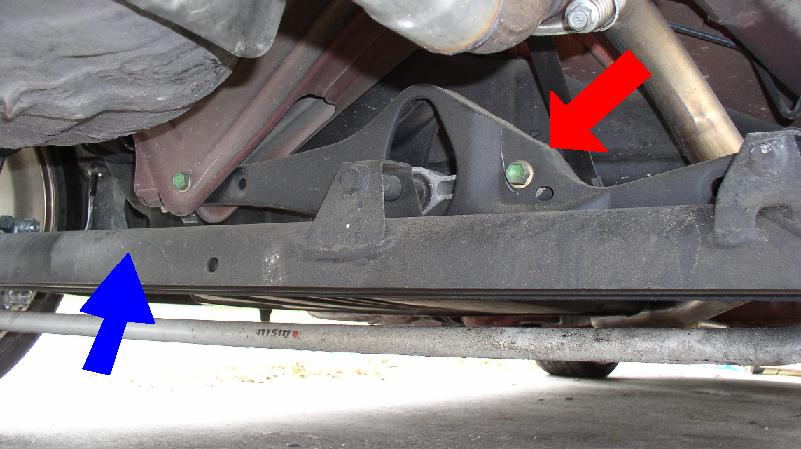
A Scott Russell linkage on the rear axle of a 2002 Nissan Sentra.

The linkage is composed of two links. One link is double the size of the other, and is connected to the smaller link by its midpoint.

One of the ends is then connected to something that can generate linear motion, such as a rolling or sliding connection, or another straight line mechanism.

The Evans 'grasshopper' linkage is a variant of a Scott Russell linkage which uses a long link to create a large enough arc to approximate a line.

The Bricard inversor directly incorporates the Scott Russell's links, replacing the previously required straight line connection and allowing for two exact straight line outputs at right angles.

== Difference: Scott-Russell linkage and Trammel of Archimedes ==
The two linkages are very similar, but with an important difference. With the single sliding connection of the Scott-Russell mechanism, the constraining effect on the free end of the long link to move in a straight line becomes weaker and weaker if the slider is allowed to approach the axis of rotation of the short link. If this position is reached, the two links can rotate as one. At the same time, up to this point, the toggle effect becomes stronger and the slider is subjected to increasing lateral forces. A Scott-Russell linkage must therefore be operated within a limited range, keeping the slider pivot and the axis of rotation of the short link as far apart as possible. By contrast, the Trammel of Archimedes has a slider at both ends of the long link (the trammel), making it capable of continuous 360° operation.
