= Wittgenstein's rod =

Geometrical problem involving a sliding rod driven by a crank

An asymmetric case produced by a long rod

Wittgenstein's rod is a problem in geometry discussed by 20th-century philosopher Ludwig Wittgenstein.

== Description ==
A ray is drawn with its origin A on a circle, through an external point S and a point B is chosen at some constant distance from the starting end of the ray; what figure does B describe when all the initial points on the circle are considered? The answer depends on three parameters: the radius of the circle, the distance from the center to S, and the length of the segment A̅B̅. The shape described by B can be seen as a 'figure-eight' which in some cases degenerates to a single lobe looking like an inverted cardioid.

If B remains on the same side of S with respect to the center of the circle, instead of a ray one can consider just a segment or the rod A̅B̅.

Wittgenstein sketched a mechanism and wrote:

While the point A describes a circle, B describes a figure eight. Now we write this down as a proposition of kinematics.

When I work the mechanism its movement proves the proposition to me; as would a construction on paper.

The proposition corresponds e.g. to a picture of the mechanism with the paths of the points A and B drawn in. Thus it is in a certain respect a picture of that movement. It holds fast what the proof shows me. Or – what it persuades me of.

This text has been included among the notes selected for publication in Remarks on the Foundations of Mathematics and the editors have dated in the as spring of 1944.

== Related mechanism ==
Wittgenstein's rod is a generalization of the Hoecken linkage.

== Animations ==
Teardrop-shaped

Fixed point close to the circle

Fixed point very close to the circle

Fixed point inside the circle, bean-shaped curve

Wittgenstein's rod: four cases

== See also ==
- Oscillating cylinder steam engine — a steam engine using a Wittgenstein's rod scribing a figure-of-eight shape (it does not make use of the curve scribed)
