= Chebyshev lambda linkage =

Four-bar straight-line mechanism

Animation of the Chebyshev Lambda Linkage Dimensions (unit length a): Link 2: a Link 4: 2.5a Link 3: 2.5a + 2.5a Link 1 (horizontal distance between ground joints): 2a

Chebyshev's plantigrade machine.

A Chebyshev Translating Table Linkage, which combines together two cognate linkages: the Chebyshev Linkage and Chebyshev Lambda Linkage.

In kinematics, the Chebyshev Lambda Linkage is a four-bar linkage that converts rotational motion to approximate straight-line motion with approximate constant velocity. It is so-named because it looks like a lowercase Greek letter lambda (λ). The precise design trades off straightness, lack of acceleration, and the proportion of the driving rotation that is spent in the linear portion of the full curve.

The example to the right spends over half of the cycle in the near-straight portion. The coupler (link 3) point stays within 1% positional tolerance while intersecting the ideal straight line 6 times.

The linkage was first shown in Paris on the Exposition Universelle (1878) as "The Plantigrade Machine". The Chebyshev Lambda Linkage is a cognate linkage of the Chebyshev linkage.

The Chebyshev Lambda Linkage is used in vehicle suspension mechanisms, walking robots, and rover wheel mechanisms. In 2004, a study completed as a Master of Science Thesis at Izmir Institute of Technology introduced a new mechanism design by combining two symmetrical Lambda linkages to distribute the force evenly on to ground with providing the straight vertical wheel motion. It was then designed, manufactured, and tested in the Earth Rover Project of Los Angeles City College Electronics Club.

== See also ==
- Chebyshev linkage, the cognate of the Chebyshev lambda linkage.
- Hoeckens linkage, a linkage that produces a very similar locus using one less link but an additional slider.
- Leg mechanism
- Straight line mechanism
