= Chebyshev linkage =

Four-bar straight-line mechanism

Animation for the Chebyshev linkage. Dimensions (unit length a): Link 3: a + a Links 2 & 4: 5a Link 1 (horizontal distance between ground joints): 4a

Illustration of the limits

In kinematics, Chebyshev's linkage is a four-bar linkage that converts rotational motion to approximate linear motion.

It was invented by the 19th-century mathematician Pafnuty Chebyshev, who studied theoretical problems in kinematic mechanisms. One of the problems was the construction of a linkage that converts a rotary motion into an approximate straight-line motion (a straight line mechanism). This was also studied by James Watt in his improvements to the steam engine, which resulted in Watt's linkage.

== Equations of motion ==
The motion of the linkage can be constrained to an input angle that may be changed through velocities, forces, etc. The input angles can be either link L_{2} with the horizontal or link L_{4} with the horizontal. Regardless of the input angle, it is possible to compute the motion of two end-points for link L_{3} that we will name A and B, and the middle point.

$$x_A =  L_2\cos(\varphi_1) \,$$
$$y_A =  L_2\sin(\varphi_1) \,$$

while the motion of point B will be computed with the other angle,

$$x_B =  L_1 - L_4\cos(\varphi_2) \,$$
$$y_B =  L_4\sin(\varphi_2) \,$$

And ultimately, we will write the output angle in terms of the input angle,

$$\varphi_2 = \arcsin\left[\frac{L_2\,\sin(\varphi_1)}{\overline{A O_2}}\right] - \arccos\left(\frac{L_4^2 + \overline{A O_2}^2 -L_3^2}{2\,L_4\,\overline{A O_2}}\right) \,$$

Consequently, we can write the motion of point P, using the two points defined above and the definition of the middle point.

$$x_P = \frac{x_A + x_B}{2} \,$$
$$y_P = \frac{y_A + y_B}{2} \,$$

=== Input angles ===
The limits to the input angles, in both cases, are:

$$\varphi_{\text{min}} =  \arccos\left( \frac{4}{5}\right) \approx 36.8699^\circ. \,$$
$$\varphi_{\text{max}} = \arccos\left( \frac{-1}{5}\right) \approx 101.537^\circ. \,$$

== Usage ==
Chebyshev linkages did not receive widespread usage in steam engines, but are commonly used as the 'Horse head' design of level luffing crane. In this application the approximate straight movement is translated away from the line's midpoint, but it is still essentially the same mechanism.

== See also ==
Chebyshev's Lambda Mechanism (one blue and one green) shows an identical motion path

- Chebyshev lambda linkage, the cognate of the Chebyshev linkage.
- Four-bar linkage
- Straight line mechanism
