= Parallel motion linkage =

Six-bar straight-line mechanism

Animation of the parallel motion linkage. Dimensions (unit lengths a, b): Link 2: a + a Links 3 & 5: b + b, 2b Links 4 & 6: a Vertical distance between ground joints ≈ 2b Horizontal distance between ground joints ≈ 2a Thus, link 1 (total distance between ground joints) $\approx \sqrt{4a^2 + 4b^2}$

In kinematics, the parallel motion linkage is a six-bar mechanical linkage invented by the Scottish engineer James Watt in 1784 for the double-acting Watt steam engine. It allows a rod moving practically straight up and down to transmit motion to a beam moving in an arc, without putting significant sideways strain on the rod.

== Description ==
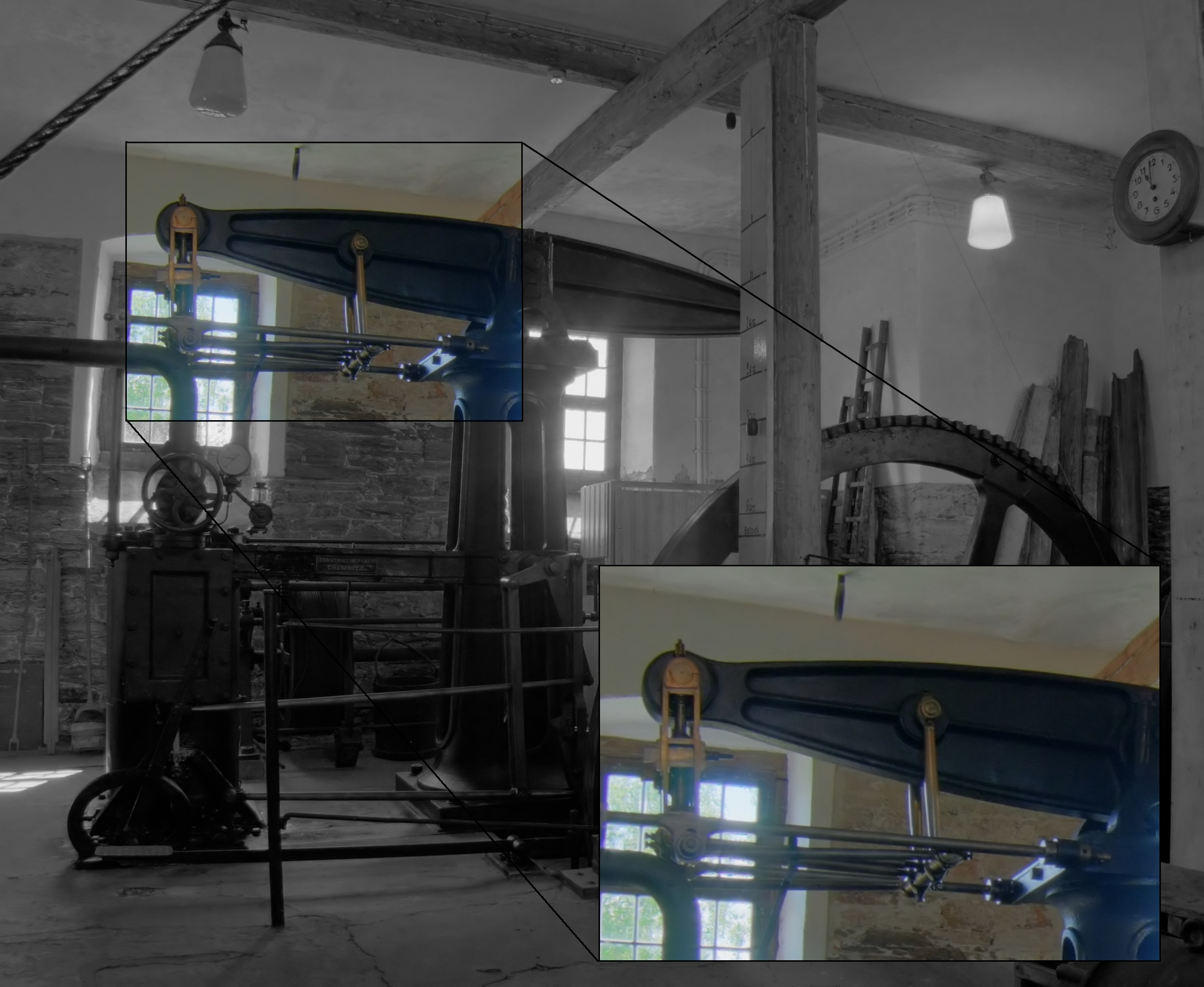
Watt's parallel motion on a pumping engine

In previous engines built by Newcomen and Watt, the piston pulled one end of the walking beam downwards during the power stroke using a chain, and the weight of the pump pulled the other end of the beam downwards during the recovery stroke using a second chain, the alternating forces producing the rocking motion of the beam. In Watt's new double-acting engine, the piston produced power on both the upward and downward strokes, so a chain could not be used to transmit the force to the beam. Watt designed the parallel motion to transmit force in both directions whilst keeping the piston rod very close to vertical. He called it "parallel motion" because both the piston and the pump rod were required to move vertically, parallel to one another.

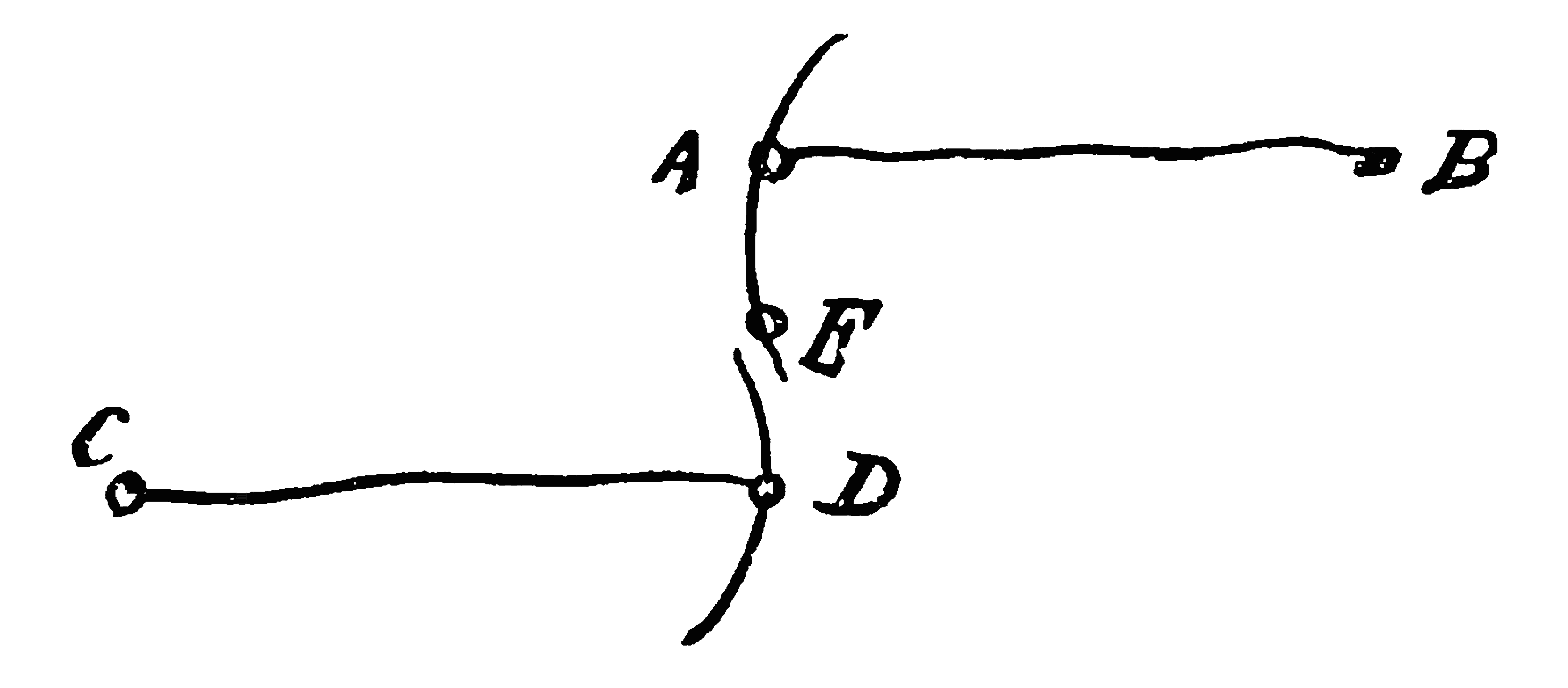
Hand-drawn diagram in James Watt's letter to his son.

In a letter to his son in 1808 describing how he arrived at the design, James Watt wrote "I am more proud of the parallel motion than of any other invention I have ever made." The sketch he included actually shows what is now known as Watt's linkage which was a linkage described in Watt's 1784 patent but it was immediately superseded by the parallel motion.

The parallel motion differed from Watt's linkage by having an additional pantograph linkage incorporated in the design. This did not affect the fundamental principle but it allowed the engine room to be smaller because the linkage was more compact.

The Newcomen engine's piston was propelled downward by the atmospheric pressure. Watt's device allowed live steam to be used for direct work on both sides of the piston, thus almost doubling the power, and also delivering the power more evenly through the cycle, an advantage when converting the reciprocating motion to rotary motion (whether through a crank or through a Sun and planet gear system).

== Principle of operation ==
Schematic of Watt's parallel motion: A and G are fixed hinge joints while F is not a joint but merely signifies the point on the linkage which follows a lemniscate. Its motion is magnified in D by the parallelogram ▱BCDE.

See the diagram on the right. A is the journal (bearing) of the walking beam K̅A̅C̅, which rocks up and down about A. H is the piston, which is required to move vertically but not horizontally. The heart of the design is the four-bar linkage consisting of A̅B̅, B̅E̅ and E̅G̅ and the base link is A̅G̅, both joints on the framework of the engine. As the beam rocks, point F (which is drawn to aid this explanation, but is not a marked point on the machine itself) describes an elongated figure-eight (more precisely, a lemniscate of Bernoulli) in mid-air. Since the motion of the walking beam is constrained to a small angle, F describes only a short section of the figure-eight, which is quite close to a vertical straight line. The figure-eight is symmetrical as long as arms A̅B̅ and E̅G̅ are equal in length, and straightest when the ratio of B̅F̅ to F̅E̅ matches that of A̅B̅ to E̅G̅. If the stroke length (that is, the maximum travel of F) is S, then the straight section is longest when B̅E̅ is around ⅔ S and A̅B̅ is 1.5 S.

It would have been possible to connect F directly to the piston rod (the "Watt's linkage" design), but this would have made the machine an awkward shape, with G a long way from the end of the walking beam. To avoid this, Watt added the parallelogram linkage ▱BCDE to form a pantograph. This guarantees that F always lies on a straight line between A and D, and therefore that the motion of D is a magnified version of the motion of F. D is therefore the point to which the piston rod D̅H̅ is attached. The addition of the pantograph made the mechanism shorter and so the building containing the engine could be smaller.

As already noted, the path of F is not a perfect straight line, but merely an approximation. Watt's design produced a deviation of about one part in 4000 from a straight line. Later, in the 19th century, perfect straight-line linkages were invented, beginning with the Peaucellier–Lipkin linkage of 1864.

== See also ==
- Pantograph, part of what the Parallel motion linkage uses.
- Straight line mechanism
- Watt's linkage, the core of how the Parallel motion linkage works.
