= Ellipsograph =

Ellipse-drawing mechanism

Trammel of Archimedes animated model

An ellipsograph is a mechanism that generates the shape of an ellipse. One common form of ellipsograph is known as the trammel of Archimedes. It consists of two shuttles which are confined to perpendicular channels or rails and a rod which is attached to the shuttles by pivots at adjustable positions along the rod.

As the shuttles move back and forth, each along its channel, all points on the rod move in elliptical paths. The motion of the rod is termed elliptical motion. The semi-axes a and b of the ellipses have lengths equal to the distances from the point on the rod to each of the two pivots.

The straight lines described by the pivots are special cases of an ellipse, where the length of one axis is twice the distance between the pivots and that of the other is zero. All points on a circle with a diameter defined by the two pivots reciprocate in such straight lines. This circle corresponds to the smaller circle in a Tusi couple.

The point midway between the pivots orbits in a circle around the point where the channels cross. This circle is also a special case of an ellipse. Here the axes are of equal length. The diameter of the circle is equal to the distance between the pivots. The direction of travel around the orbit is opposite to the sense of rotation of the trammel. Thus, if a crank centred on the crossing point of the channels is used to engage the trammel at the midway point to drive it, the rotation of the crankpin and the trammel are equal and opposite, which in practical applications results in extra friction and accelerated wear. This is compounded by high forces owing to the short throw of the crank of only one quarter the travel of the pivots.

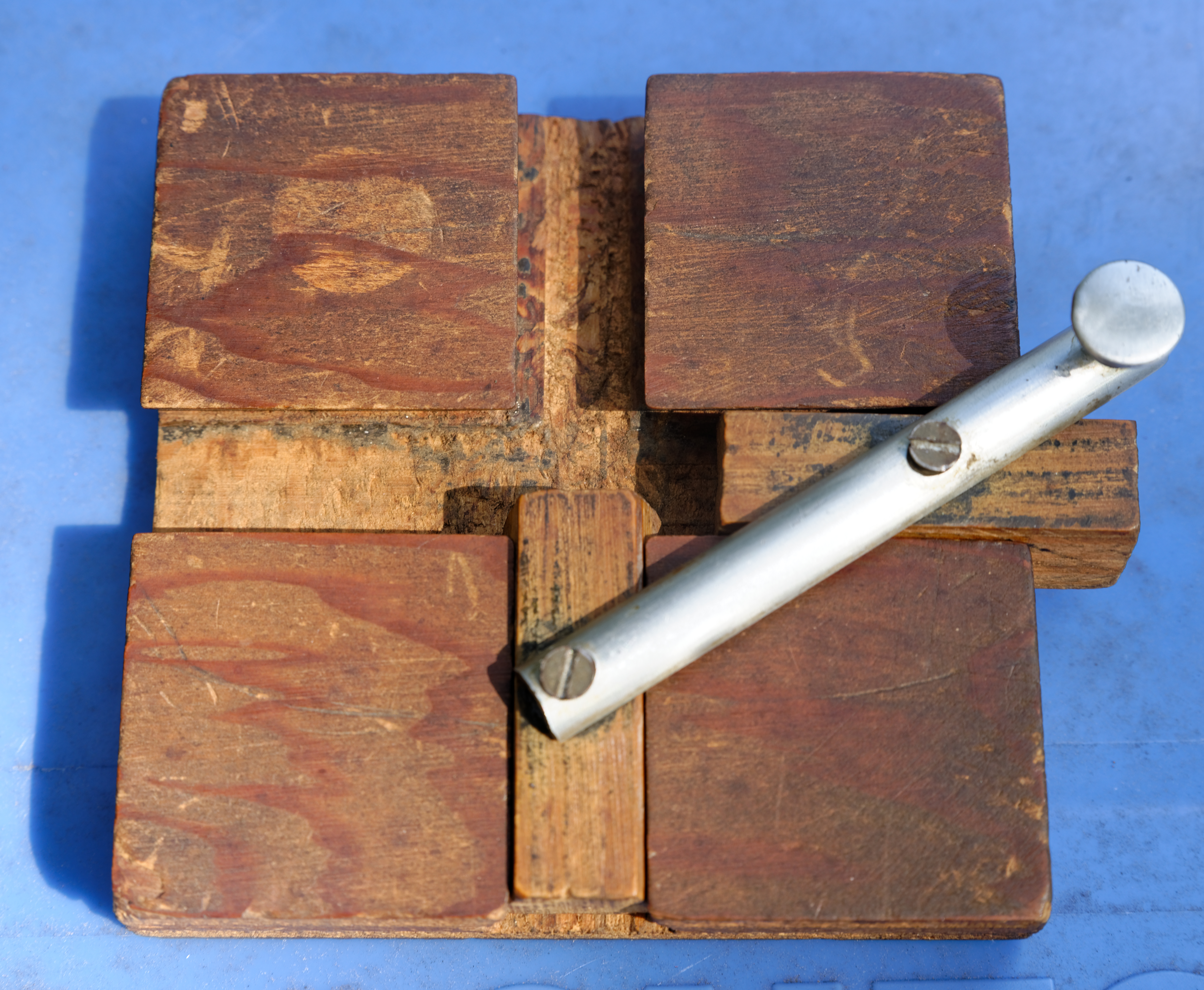
"Bullshit grinder" toy (c. 1960)

Versions are also made as toys or novelty items (sold under the name of Kentucky do-nothings, nothing grinders, do nothing machines, smoke grinders, or bullshit grinders). In these toys the drafting instrument is replaced by a crank handle, and the positions of the sliding shuttles along the rod are usually fixed.

== Mathematics ==
Concept
Trammel of Archimedes as ellipsograph

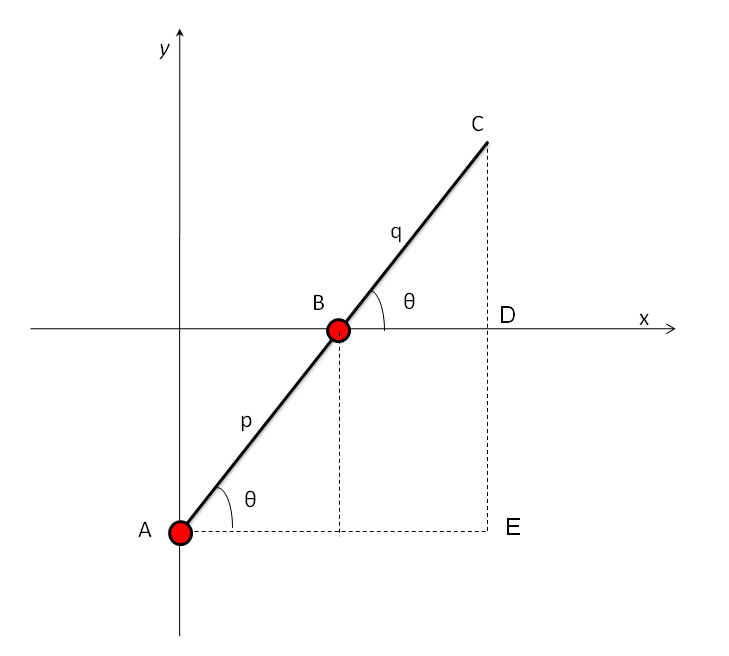
Diagram

Loci of some points along and beyond a trammel of Archimedes, the green circle being the loci of its midpoint – in the SVG file, move the pointer over the diagram to move the trammel

Trammel of Archimedes with three sliders

Let C be the outer end of the rod, and A, B be the pivots of the sliders. Let AB and BC be the distances from A to B and B to C, respectively. Let us assume that sliders A and B move along the y and x coordinate axes, respectively. When the rod makes an angle θ with the x-axis, the coordinates of point C are given by

$$\begin{align} x &= (AB+BC)\cos\theta\, \\ y &= BC\sin\theta\, \end{align}$$

These are in the form of the standard parametric equations for an ellipse in canonical position. The further equation

$$\frac{x^2}{(AB+BC)^2} + \frac{y^2}{(BC)^2}= 1$$

is immediate as well.

The trammel of Archimedes is an example of a four-bar linkage with two sliders and two pivots, and is special case of the more general oblique trammel. The axes constraining the pivots do not have to be perpendicular and the points A, B and C can form a triangle. The resulting locus of C is still an ellipse.

== Ellipsographs ==
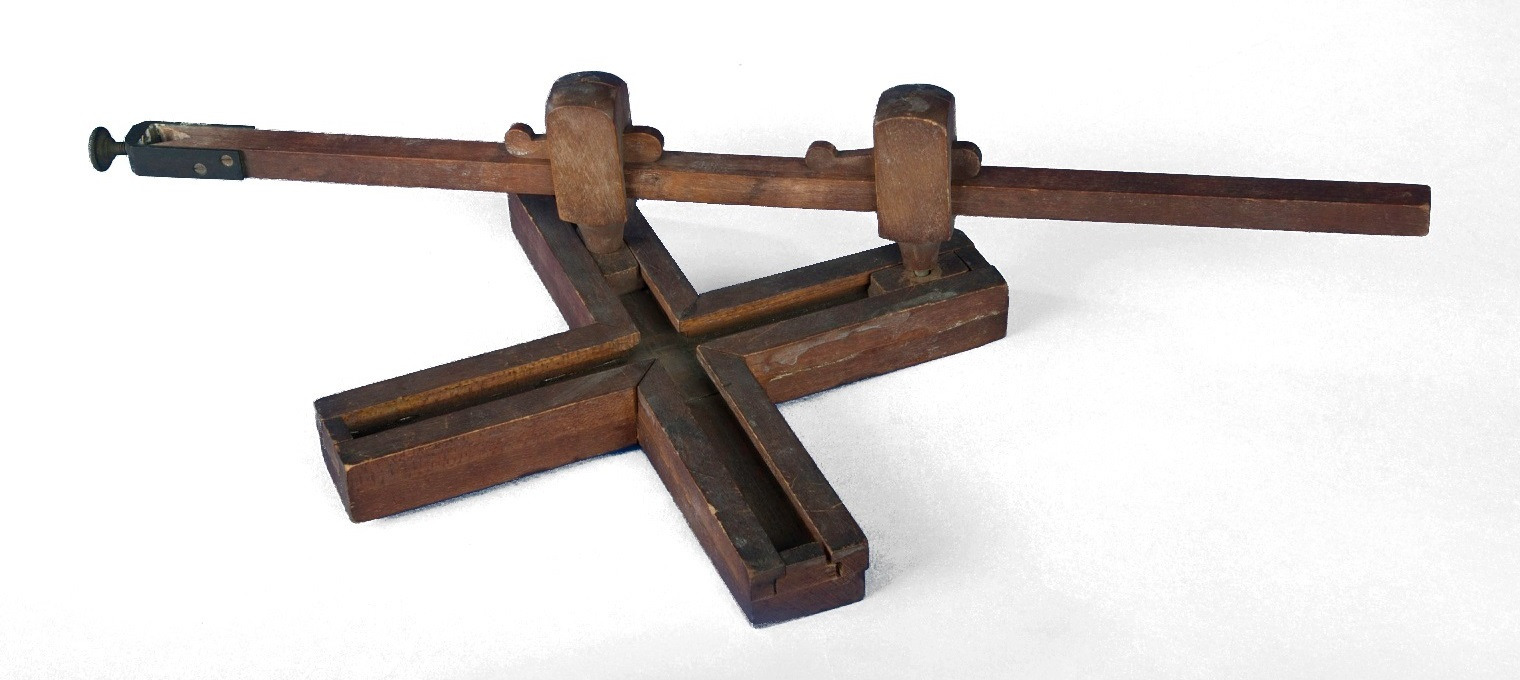
Wooden ellipsograph (ca. 1900) now at Smithsonian

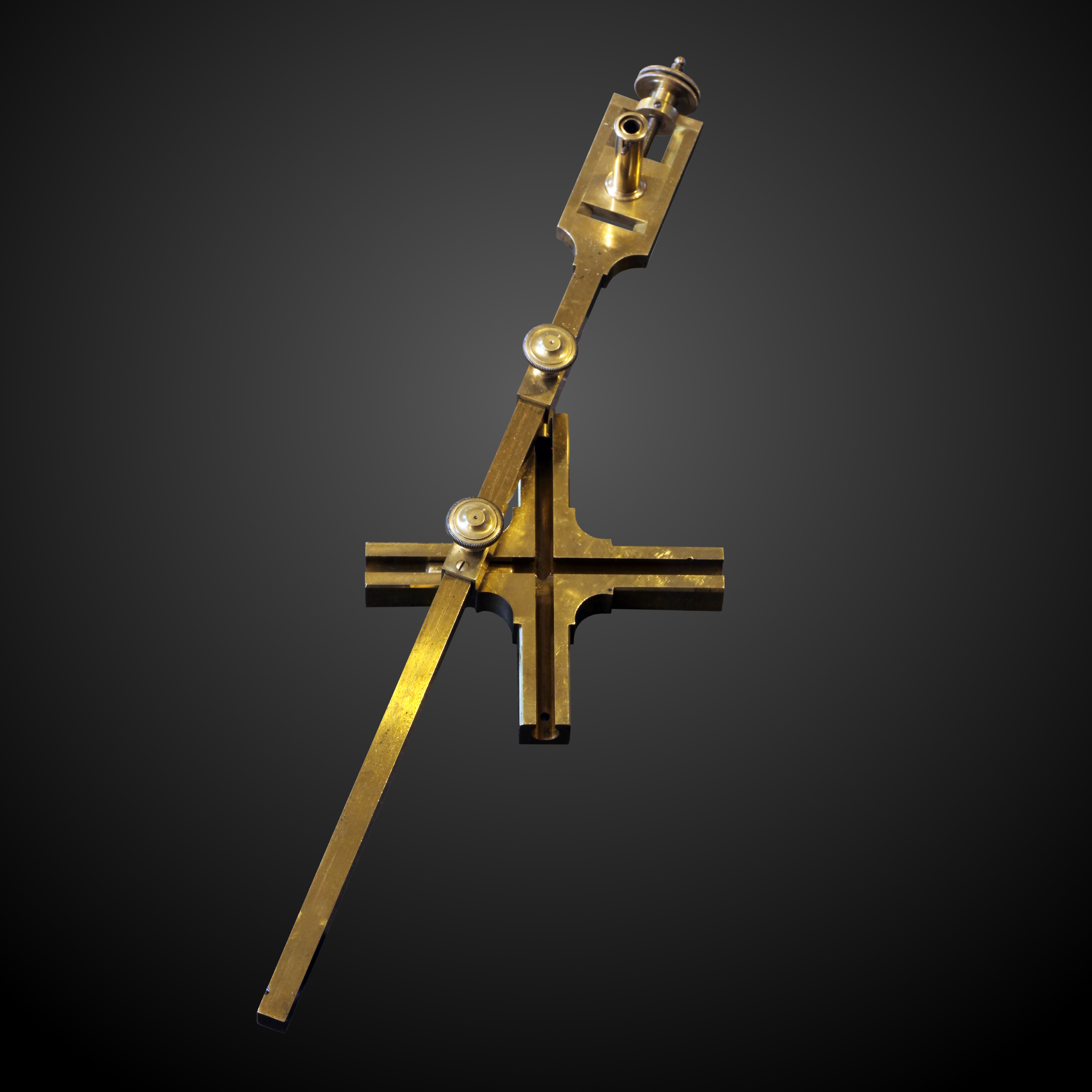
Ellipsograph on display at Musée d'histoire des sciences de la Ville de Genève

An ellipsograph is a trammel of Archimedes intended to draw, cut, or machine ellipses, e.g. in wood or other sheet materials. An ellipsograph has the appropriate instrument (pencil, knife, router, etc.) attached to the rod. Usually the distances a and b are adjustable, so that the size and shape of the ellipse can be varied.

The history of such ellipsographs is not certain, but they are believed to date back to Proclus and perhaps even to the time of Archimedes.

== See also ==
- Beam compass
- Bourke engine
- John Farey Jr.
- Hypocycloid
- Hypotrochoid
- Tusi couple
- Useless machine
- Scott Russell linkage
