= Cognate linkage =

Linkages of different dimensions with the same output motion

Showcase of nine different coupler-curve cognate linkages. Top row: Four-bar cognate linkages. Middle row: Geared five-bar cognate linkages, derived from top row. Bottom row: Closely related six-bar cognate linkages, derived from middle row.

In kinematics, cognate linkages are linkages that ensure the same coupler curve geometry or input-output relationship, while being dimensionally dissimilar. In case of four-bar linkage coupler cognates, the Roberts–Chebyshev Theorem, after Samuel Roberts and Pafnuty Chebyshev, states that each coupler curve can be generated by three different four-bar linkages. These four-bar linkages can be constructed using similar triangles and parallelograms, and the Cayley diagram (named after Arthur Cayley).

Overconstrained mechanisms can be obtained by connecting two or more cognate linkages together.

== Roberts–Chebyshev theorem ==
The theorem states, for a given coupler curve produced by a four-bar linkage with four revolute (hinge) joints, there exist three four-bar linkages, three geared five-bar linkages, and more six-bar linkages which will generate the same path.

For a coupler curve produced by a four-bar linkage with four revolute joints and a prismatic (slider) joint, there exist only two four-bar linkages, as the third would be composed of two sliders, making it a four-bar linkage with two degrees of freedom.

== Construction of four-bar coupler cognates ==
=== Cayley diagram ===
Cayley diagram for generating 4-bar coupler cognates.

Animation showing the construction of two four-bar cognate linkages from an initial four-bar cognate.

From original triangle, ΔA_{1}DB_{1}:

1. Sketch Cayley diagram.
2. Using parallelograms, find A_{2} and B_{3} ▱O_{A}A_{1}DA_{2} and ▱O_{B}B_{1}DB_{3}.
3. Using similar triangles, find C_{2} and C_{3} ΔA_{2}C_{2}D and ΔDC_{3}B_{3}.
4. Using a parallelogram, find O_{C} ▱O_{C}C_{2}DC_{3}.
5. Check similar triangles ΔO_{A}O_{C}O_{B}.
6. Separate left and right cognate.
7. Put dimensions on Cayley diagram.

=== Dimensional relationships ===
Linkage dimensions.

The lengths of the four members can be found by using the law of sines. Both K_{L} and K_{R} are found as follows.

$$K_L=\frac{\sin(\alpha)}{\sin(\beta)} \qquad K_R=\frac{\sin(\gamma)}{\sin(\beta)}$$

Linkage	Ground	Crank 1	Crank 2	Coupler
Original	R_{1}	R_{2}	R_{3}	R_{4}
Left cognate	K_{L}R_{1}	K_{L}R_{3}	K_{L}R_{4}	K_{L}R_{2}
Right cognate	K_{R}R_{1}	K_{R}R_{2}	K_{R}R_{3}	K_{R}R_{4}

=== Conclusions ===
- If and only if the original is a Class I chain $(\ell+s)<(p+q)$ Both 4-bar cognates will be class I chains.
- If the original is a drag-link (double crank), both cognates will be drag links.
- If the original is a crank-rocker, one cognate will be a crank-rocker, and the second will be a double-rocker.
- If the original is a double-rocker, the cognates will be crank-rockers.

== Construction of geared five-bar cognates ==
Animation showing the construction of a geared five-bar cognate linkages from an initial four-bar cognate.

A five-bar linkage has two degrees of freedom, and thus there does not exist a five-bar linkage which is capable of acting as a cognate. (Note: There are specific overconstrained configurations that have a DOF of 0, however they are not useful in the construction of cognate linkages.) However, it is possible to generate a 5-bar cognate using gears.

1. Select four-bar linkage of choice.
2. Construct two parallelograms off of the center coupler link and the links connected to the ground.
3. On each parallelogram, find the sides opposite of the connecting link. Apply a 1:1 gear train between them.
4. Separate cognates.

The utilization of the 1:1 gear train is used because of the behavior of parallelogram linkages. Opposite 'sides' of the parallelogram linkages share the same rotational motion function. Because both parallelograms were constructed off of the center coupler link, the new links connected to the ground share identical rotational motion functions, allowing for a 1:1 gear train to be used to connect them together.

== Construction of six-bar coupler cognates ==
Animation showing the construction of a six-bar cognate linkages from an initial four-bar cognate.

Animation showing the construction of Chebyshev's table linkage using the two cognate linkages Chebyshev linkage and Chebyshev lambda linkage.
The pink link indicates the former ground link that has become a rectilinear link.

=== Alternative to geared five-bar cognates ===
The geared five-bar cognate linkage utilizes a 1:1 gear train to ensure two links have the same rotational motion function. However, an alternative to using a gear train to achieve 1:1 rotation is to connect them together using a parallelogram linkage, adding one additional link.

=== Pairing previously derived cognates together ===
An important behavior with four-bar linkages is that once the positions of two links is defined, the other two links in the four-bar linkage can be defined.

One characteristic with cognate linkages is that they often share at least two links in identical configuration. These links are usually oriented 180 degrees of each other, so when pairing, these links can be fused. This creates a 4-bar linkage with two additional links, both of which are defined by the original four-bar linkage. The former ground link of the fusing 4-bar linkage becomes a rectilinear link that travels follows the same coupler curve.

Each of these paired six-bar cognate linkages can also be converted into another cognate linkage by flipping the linkage over, and switching the roles of the rectilinear link and the ground link.

== Construction of coupler cognates with more links ==
Appending onto the method of the six-bar pairings, the links do not necessarily have to overlap, but rather just need to meet the criterion such that:

- There is a pair of two links in identical configuration.
- The former ground link of one of the linkages is directly attached to the point producing the coupler curve.

Rather than overlapping the paired links, they can be attached in a fashion which forms a parallelogram, resulting in eight-bar cognate linkages. Triplet cognate linkage pairings and further extensions are also possible, allowing for the number of links of cognate linkages to increase theoretically indefinitely.

== Function cognates ==
Animation showing the construction of a function cognate.

Function cognate linkages are linkages which share the same motion functions for their input and output links. This is performed using a six-bar Watt II linkage arrangement.

1. Split the six bar linkage into two quadrilaterals (shown as $\square X_{1}ABC$ and $\square X_{2}CDE$).
2. Translate the ground joint $C$ to a new location, $C'$.
3. With the new ground joint $C'$, form two similar quadrilaterals (shown as $\square X_{1}A'B'C'$ and $\square X_{2}C'D'E'$).
4. Reform the shared link $C'B'D'$.
5. Separate Cognates.

Similar quadrilaterals will have links which share the same motion function. Because one link is shared between the two quadrilaterals, then as long as the new quadrilaterals are similar to the original, both will still share a link with the same motion function.

If the new quadrilaterals do not share the same ground joint (as shown with joint C'), they can still be connected together using a parallelogram linkage, forming an 8-bar function cognate.

== See also ==
- Arthur Cayley - Cayley Diagram
- Four-bar linkage
- Kinematic pair
- Linkage (mechanical)
- Pafnuty Chebyshev - Roberts–Chebyshev Theorem
- Samuel Roberts - Roberts–Chebyshev Theorem
- De Casteljau's algorithm
