= Parity of zero =

Quality of zero being an even number

The weighing pans of this balance scale contain zero objects, divided into two equal groups.

In mathematics, zero is an even number. In other words, its parity—the quality of an integer being even or odd—is even. This can be easily verified based on the definition of "even": zero is an integer multiple of 2, specifically 0 × 2. As a result, zero shares all the properties that characterize even numbers: for example, 0 is neighbored on both sides by odd numbers, any decimal integer has the same parity as its last digit—so, since 10 is even, 0 will be even, and if y is even then y + x has the same parity as x—indeed, 0 + x and x always have the same parity.

Zero also fits into the patterns formed by other even numbers. The parity rules of arithmetic, such as even − even = even, require 0 to be even. Zero is the additive identity element of the group of even integers, and it is the starting case from which other even natural numbers are recursively defined. Applications of this recursion from graph theory to computational geometry rely on zero being even. Not only is 0 divisible by 2, it is divisible by every power of 2, which is relevant to the binary numeral system used by computers. In this sense, 0 is the "most even" number of all.

Among the general public, the parity of zero can be a source of confusion. In reaction time experiments, most people are slower to identify 0 as even than 2, 4, 6, or 8. Some teachers—and some children in mathematics classes—think that zero is odd, or both even and odd, or neither. Researchers in mathematics education propose that these misconceptions can become learning opportunities. Studying equalities like 0 × 2 = 0 can address students' doubts about calling 0 a number and using it in arithmetic. Class discussions can lead students to appreciate the basic principles of mathematical reasoning, such as the importance of definitions. Evaluating the parity of this exceptional number is an early example of a pervasive theme in mathematics: the abstraction of a familiar concept to an unfamiliar setting.

== Why zero is even ==
The standard definition of "even number" can be used to directly prove that zero is even. A number is called "even" if it is an integer multiple of 2. As an example, the reason that 10 is even is that it equals 5 × 2. In the same way, zero is an integer multiple of 2, namely 0 × 2, so zero is even.

It is also possible to explain why zero is even without referring to formal definitions. The following explanations make sense of the idea that zero is even in terms of fundamental number concepts. From this foundation, one can provide a rationale for the definition itself—and its applicability to zero.

=== Basic explanations ===
The box with 0 objects has no red object left over.

Given a set of objects, one uses a number to describe how many objects are in the set. Zero is the count of no objects; in more formal terms, it is the number of objects in the empty set. The concept of parity is used for making groups of two objects. If the objects in a set can be marked off into groups of two, with none left over, then the number of objects is even. If an object is left over, then the number of objects is odd. The empty set contains zero groups of two, and no object is left over from this grouping, so zero is even.

These ideas can be illustrated by drawing objects in pairs. It is difficult to depict zero groups of two, or to emphasize the nonexistence of a leftover object, so it helps to draw other groupings and to compare them with zero. For example, in the group of five objects, there are two pairs. More importantly, there is a leftover object, so 5 is odd. In the group of four objects, there is no leftover object, so 4 is even. In the group of just one object, there are no pairs, and there is a leftover object, so 1 is odd. In the group of zero objects, there is no leftover object, so 0 is even.

There is another concrete definition of evenness: if the objects in a set can be placed into two groups of equal size, then the number of objects is even. This definition is equivalent to the first one. Again, zero is even because the empty set can be divided into two groups of zero items each.

Numbers can also be visualized as points on a number line. When even and odd numbers are distinguished from each other, their pattern becomes obvious, especially if negative numbers are included:

The even and odd numbers alternate. Starting at any even number, counting up or down by twos reaches the other even numbers, and there is no reason to skip over zero.

With the introduction of multiplication, parity can be approached in a more formal way using arithmetic expressions. Every integer is either of the form (2 × ▢) + 0 or (2 × ▢) + 1; the former numbers are even and the latter are odd. For example, 1 is odd because 1 = (2 × 0) + 1, and 0 is even because 0 = (2 × 0) + 0. Making a table of these facts then reinforces the number line picture above.

=== Defining parity ===
The precise definition of a mathematical term, such as "even" meaning "integer multiple of two", is ultimately a convention. Unlike "even", some mathematical terms are purposefully constructed to exclude trivial or degenerate cases. Prime numbers are a famous example. Before the 20th century, definitions of primality were inconsistent, and significant mathematicians such as Goldbach, Lambert, Legendre, Cayley, and Kronecker wrote that 1 was prime. The modern definition of "prime number" is "positive integer with exactly 2 factors", so 1 is not prime. This definition can be rationalized by observing that it more naturally suits mathematical theorems that concern the primes. For example, the fundamental theorem of arithmetic is easier to state when 1 is not considered prime.

It would be possible to similarly redefine the term "even" in a way that no longer includes zero. However, in this case, the new definition would make it more difficult to state theorems concerning the even numbers. Already the effect can be seen in the algebraic rules governing even and odd numbers. The most relevant rules concern addition, subtraction, and multiplication:

even ± even = even
odd ± odd = even
even × integer = even

Inserting appropriate values into the left sides of these rules, one can produce 0 on the right sides:

2 − 2 = 0
−3 + 3 = 0
4 × 0 = 0

The above rules would therefore be incorrect if zero were not even. At best they would have to be modified. For example, one test study guide asserts that even numbers are characterized as integer multiples of two, but zero is "neither even nor odd". Accordingly, the guide's rules for even and odd numbers contain exceptions:

even ± even = even (or zero)
odd ± odd = even (or zero)
even × nonzero integer = even

Making an exception for zero in the definition of evenness forces one to make such exceptions in the rules for even numbers. From another perspective, taking the rules obeyed by positive even numbers and requiring that they continue to hold for integers forces the usual definition and the evenness of zero.

== Mathematical contexts ==
Countless results in number theory invoke the fundamental theorem of arithmetic and the algebraic properties of even numbers, so the above choices have far-reaching consequences. For example, the fact that positive numbers have unique factorizations means that one can determine whether a number has an even or odd number of distinct prime factors. Since 1 is not prime, nor does it have prime factors, it is a product of 0 distinct primes; since 0 is an even number, 1 has an even number of distinct prime factors. This implies that the Möbius function takes the value μ(1) = 1, which is necessary for it to be a multiplicative function and for the Möbius inversion formula to work.

=== Not being odd ===
A number n is odd if there is an integer k such that n = 2k + 1. One way to prove that zero is not odd is by contradiction: if 0 = 2k + 1 then k = −1/2, which is not an integer. Since zero is not odd, if an unknown number is proven to be odd, then it cannot be zero. This apparently trivial observation can provide a convenient and revealing proof explaining why an odd number is nonzero.

A classic result of graph theory states that a graph of odd order (having an odd number of vertices) always has at least one vertex of even degree. (The statement itself requires zero to be even: the empty graph has an even order, and an isolated vertex has an even degree.) In order to prove the statement, it is actually easier to prove a stronger result: any odd-order graph has an odd number of even degree vertices. The appearance of this odd number is explained by a still more general result, known as the handshaking lemma: any graph has an even number of vertices of odd degree. Finally, the even number of odd vertices is naturally explained by the degree sum formula.

Sperner's lemma is a more advanced application of the same strategy. The lemma states that a certain kind of coloring on a triangulation of a simplex has a subsimplex that contains every color. Rather than directly construct such a subsimplex, it is more convenient to prove that there exists an odd number of such subsimplices through an induction argument. A stronger statement of the lemma then explains why this number is odd: it naturally breaks down as (n + 1) + n when one considers the two possible orientations of a simplex.

=== Even-odd alternation ===
Recursive definition of natural number parity

The fact that zero is even, together with the fact that even and odd numbers alternate, is enough to determine the parity of every other natural number. This idea can be formalized into a recursive definition of the set of even natural numbers:

- 0 is even.
- (n + 1) is even if and only if n is not even.

This definition has the conceptual advantage of relying only on the minimal foundations of the natural numbers: the existence of 0 and of successors. As such, it is useful for computer logic systems such as LF and the Isabelle theorem prover. With this definition, the evenness of zero is not a theorem but an axiom. Indeed, "zero is an even number" may be interpreted as one of the Peano axioms, of which the even natural numbers are a model. A similar construction extends the definition of parity to transfinite ordinal numbers: every limit ordinal is even, including zero, and successors of even ordinals are odd.

Point in polygon test

The classic point in polygon test from computational geometry applies the above ideas. To determine if a point lies within a polygon, one casts a ray from infinity to the point and counts the number of times the ray crosses the edge of polygon. The crossing number is even if and only if the point is outside the polygon. This algorithm works because if the ray never crosses the polygon, then its crossing number is zero, which is even, and the point is outside. Every time the ray does cross the polygon, the crossing number alternates between even and odd, and the point at its tip alternates between outside and inside.

Constructing a bipartition

In graph theory, a bipartite graph is a graph whose vertices are split into two colors, such that neighboring vertices have different colors. If a connected graph has no odd cycles, then a bipartition can be constructed by choosing a base vertex v and coloring every vertex black or white, depending on whether its distance from v is even or odd. Since the distance between v and itself is 0, and 0 is even, the base vertex is colored differently from its neighbors, which lie at a distance of 1.

=== Algebraic patterns ===
2Z (blue) as subgroup of Z

In abstract algebra, the even integers form various algebraic structures that require the inclusion of zero. The fact that the additive identity (zero) is even, together with the evenness of sums and additive inverses of even numbers and the associativity of addition, means that the even integers form a group. Moreover, the group of even integers under addition is a subgroup of the group of all integers; this is an elementary example of the subgroup concept. The earlier observation that the rule "even − even = even" forces 0 to be even is part of a general pattern: any nonempty subset of an additive group that is closed under subtraction must be a subgroup, and in particular, must contain the identity.

Since the even integers form a subgroup of the integers, they partition the integers into cosets. These cosets may be described as the equivalence classes of the following equivalence relation: x ~ y if (x − y) is even. Here, the evenness of zero is directly manifested as the reflexivity of the binary relation ~. There are only two cosets of this subgroup—the even and odd numbers—so it has index 2.

Analogously, the alternating group is a subgroup of index 2 in the symmetric group on n letters. The elements of the alternating group, called even permutations, are the products of even numbers of transpositions. The identity map, an empty product of no transpositions, is an even permutation since zero is even; it is the identity element of the group.

The rule "even × integer = even" means that the even numbers form an ideal in the ring of integers, and the above equivalence relation can be described as equivalence modulo this ideal. In particular, even integers are exactly those integers k where k ≡ 0 (mod 2). This formulation is useful for investigating integer zeroes of polynomials.

=== 2-adic order ===
There is a sense in which some multiples of 2 are "more even" than others. Multiples of 4 are called doubly even, since they can be divided by 2 twice. Not only is zero divisible by 4, zero has the unique property of being divisible by every power of 2, so it surpasses all other numbers in "evenness".

One consequence of this fact appears in the bit-reversed ordering of integer data types used by some computer algorithms, such as the Cooley–Tukey fast Fourier transform. This ordering has the property that the farther to the left the first 1 occurs in a number's binary expansion, or the more times it is divisible by 2, the sooner it appears. Zero's bit reversal is still zero; it can be divided by 2 any number of times, and its binary expansion does not contain any 1s, so it always comes first.

Although 0 is divisible by 2 more times than any other number, it is not straightforward to quantify exactly how many times that is. For any nonzero integer n, one may define the 2-adic order of n to be the number of times n is divisible by 2. This description does not work for 0; no matter how many times it is divided by 2, it can always be divided by 2 again. Rather, the usual convention is to set the 2-order of 0 to be infinity as a special case. This convention is not peculiar to the 2-order; it is one of the axioms of an additive valuation in higher algebra.

The powers of two—1, 2, 4, 8, ...—form a simple sequence of numbers of increasing 2-order. In the 2-adic numbers, such sequences actually converge to zero.

== Education ==
Percentage responses over time

The subject of the parity of zero is often treated within the first two or three years of primary education, as the concept of even and odd numbers is introduced and developed.

=== Students' knowledge ===
The chart on the right depicts children's beliefs about the parity of zero, as they progress from Year 1 (age 5–6 years) to Year 6 (age 10–11 years) of the English education system. The data is from Len Frobisher, who conducted a pair of surveys of English schoolchildren. Frobisher was interested in how knowledge of single-digit parity translates to knowledge of multiple-digit parity, and zero figures prominently in the results.

In a preliminary survey of nearly 400 seven-year-olds, 45% chose even over odd when asked the parity of zero. A follow-up investigation offered more choices: neither, both, and don't know. This time the number of children in the same age range identifying zero as even dropped to 32%. Success in deciding that zero is even initially shoots up and then levels off at around 50% in Years 3 to 6. For comparison, the easiest task, identifying the parity of a single digit, levels off at about 85% success.

In interviews, Frobisher elicited the students' reasoning. One fifth-year decided that 0 was even because it was found on the 2 times table. A couple of fourth-years realized that zero can be split into equal parts. Another fourth-year reasoned "1 is odd and if I go down it's even." The interviews also revealed the misconceptions behind incorrect responses. A second-year was "quite convinced" that zero was odd, on the basis that "it is the first number you count". A fourth-year referred to 0 as "none" and thought that it was neither odd nor even, since "it's not a number". In another study, Annie Keith observed a class of 15 second-graders who convinced each other that zero was an even number based on even-odd alternation and on the possibility of splitting a group of zero things in two equal groups.

More in-depth investigations were conducted by Esther Levenson, Pessia Tsamir, and Dina Tirosh, who interviewed a pair of sixth-grade students in the USA who were performing highly in their mathematics class. One student preferred deductive explanations of mathematical claims, while the other preferred practical examples. Both students initially thought that 0 was neither even nor odd, for different reasons. Levenson et al. demonstrated how the students' reasoning reflected their concepts of zero and division.

Claims made by students
"Zero is not even or odd."
"Zero could be even."
"Zero is not odd."
"Zero has to be an even."
"Zero is not an even number."
"Zero is always going to be an even number."
"Zero is not always going to be an even number."
"Zero is even."
"Zero is special."

Deborah Loewenberg Ball analyzed US third grade students' ideas about even and odd numbers and zero, which they had just been discussing with a group of fourth-graders. The students discussed the parity of zero, the rules for even numbers, and how mathematics is done. The claims about zero took many forms, as seen in the list on the right. Ball and her coauthors argued that the episode demonstrated how students can "do mathematics in school", as opposed to the usual reduction of the discipline to the mechanical solution of exercises.

One of the themes in the research literature is the tension between students' concept images of parity and their concept definitions. Levenson et al.'s sixth-graders both defined even numbers as multiples of 2 or numbers divisible by 2, but they were initially unable to apply this definition to zero, because they were unsure how to multiply or divide zero by 2. The interviewer eventually led them to conclude that zero was even; the students took different routes to this conclusion, drawing on a combination of images, definitions, practical explanations, and abstract explanations. In another study, David Dickerson and Damien Pitman examined the use of definitions by five advanced undergraduate mathematics majors. They found that the undergraduates were largely able to apply the definition of "even" to zero, but they were still not convinced by this reasoning, since it conflicted with their concept images.

=== Teachers' knowledge ===
Researchers of mathematics education at the University of Michigan have included the true-or-false prompt "0 is an even number" in a database of over 250 questions designed to measure teachers' content knowledge. For them, the question exemplifies "common knowledge ... that any well-educated adult should have", and it is "ideologically neutral" in that the answer does not vary between traditional and reform mathematics. In a 2000–2004 study of 700 primary teachers in the United States, overall performance on these questions significantly predicted improvements in students' standardized test scores after taking the teachers' classes. In a more in-depth 2008 study, the researchers found a school where all of the teachers thought that zero was neither odd nor even, including one teacher who was exemplary by all other measures. The misconception had been spread by a math coach in their building.

It is uncertain how many teachers harbor misconceptions about zero. The Michigan studies did not publish data for individual questions. Betty Lichtenberg, an associate professor of mathematics education at the University of South Florida, in a 1972 study reported that when a group of prospective elementary school teachers were given a true-or-false test including the item "Zero is an even number", they found it to be a "tricky question", with about two thirds answering "False".

=== Implications for instruction ===
Mathematically, proving that zero is even is a simple matter of applying a definition, but more explanation is needed in the context of education. One issue concerns the foundations of the proof; the definition of "even" as "integer multiple of 2" is not always appropriate. A student in the first years of primary education may not yet have learned what "integer" or "multiple" means, much less how to multiply with 0. Additionally, stating a definition of parity for all integers can seem like an arbitrary conceptual shortcut if the only even numbers investigated so far have been positive. It can help to acknowledge that as the number concept is extended from positive integers to include zero and negative integers, number properties such as parity are also extended in a nontrivial way.

== Numerical cognition ==
Statistical analysis of experimental data, showing separation of 0. In this smallest space analysis, only the clustering of data is meaningful; the axes are arbitrary.

Adults who do believe that zero is even can nevertheless be unfamiliar with thinking of it as even, enough so to measurably slow them down in a reaction time experiment. Stanislas Dehaene, a pioneer in the field of numerical cognition, led a series of such experiments in the early 1990s. A numeral is flashed to the subject on a monitor, and a computer records the time it takes the subject to push one of two buttons to identify the number as odd or even. The results showed that 0 was slower to process than other even numbers. Some variations of the experiment found delays as long as 60 milliseconds or about 10% of the average reaction time—a small difference but a significant one.

Dehaene's experiments were not designed specifically to investigate 0 but to compare competing models of how parity information is processed and extracted. The most specific model, the mental calculation hypothesis, suggests that reactions to 0 should be fast; 0 is a small number, and it is easy to calculate 0 × 2 = 0. (Subjects are known to compute and name the result of multiplication by zero faster than multiplication of nonzero numbers, although they are slower to verify proposed results like 2 × 0 = 0.) The results of the experiments suggested that something quite different was happening: parity information was apparently being recalled from memory along with a cluster of related properties, such as being prime or a power of two. Both the sequence of powers of two and the sequence of positive even numbers 2, 4, 6, 8, ... are well-distinguished mental categories whose members are prototypically even. Zero belongs to neither list, hence the slower responses.

Repeated experiments have shown a delay at zero for subjects with a variety of ages and national and linguistic backgrounds, confronted with number names in numeral form, spelled out, and spelled in a mirror image. Dehaene's group did find one differentiating factor: mathematical expertise. In one of their experiments, students in the École Normale Supérieure were divided into two groups: those in literary studies and those studying mathematics, physics, or biology. The slowing at 0 was "essentially found in the [literary] group", and in fact, "before the experiment, some L subjects were unsure whether 0 was odd or even and had to be reminded of the mathematical definition".

This strong dependence on familiarity again undermines the mental calculation hypothesis. The effect also suggests that it is inappropriate to include zero in experiments where even and odd numbers are compared as a group. As one study puts it, "Most researchers seem to agree that zero is not a typical even number and should not be investigated as part of the mental number line."

== Everyday contexts ==
Some of the contexts where the parity of zero makes an appearance are purely rhetorical. Linguist Joseph Grimes muses that asking, "Is zero an even number?" to married couples is a good way to get them to disagree. People who think that zero is neither even nor odd may use the parity of zero as proof that every rule has a counterexample, or as an example of a trick question.

Around the year 2000, media outlets noted a pair of unusual milestones: "1999/11/19" was the last calendar date composed of all odd digits that would occur for a very long time, and that "2000/02/02" was the first all-even date to occur in a very long time. Since these results make use of 0 being even, some readers disagreed with the idea.

In standardized tests, if a question asks about the behavior of even numbers, it might be necessary to keep in mind that zero is even. Official publications relating to the GMAT and GRE tests both state that 0 is even.

The parity of zero is relevant to odd–even rationing, in which cars may drive or purchase gasoline on alternate days, according to the parity of the last digit in their license plates. Half of the numbers in a given range end in 0, 2, 4, 6, 8 and the other half in 1, 3, 5, 7, 9, so it makes sense to include 0 with the other even numbers. However, in 1977, a Paris rationing system led to confusion; on an odd-only day, the police did not know whether 0 was even, so they avoided fining drivers whose plates ended in 0. To avoid such confusion, the relevant legislation sometimes stipulates that zero is even; such laws have been passed in New South Wales and Maryland.

On U.S. Navy vessels, even-numbered compartments are found on the port side, but zero is reserved for compartments that intersect the centerline. That is, the numbers read 6-4-2-0-1-3-5 from port to starboard.

In the game of roulette, the number 0 does not count as even or odd, giving the casino an advantage on such bets. Similarly, the parity of zero can affect payoffs in prop bets when the outcome depends on whether some randomized number is odd or even, and it turns out to be zero.

The game of "odds and evens" is also affected: if both players cast zero fingers, the total number of fingers is zero, so the even player wins. One teachers' manual suggests playing this game as a way to introduce children to the concept that 0 is divisible by 2.

== Bibliography ==
- Anderson, Ian (2001), A First Course in Discrete Mathematics, London, UK: Springer, ISBN 978-1-85233-236-5
- Anderson, Marlow; Feil, Todd (2005), A First Course in Abstract Algebra: Rings, Groups, And Fields, London, UK: CRC Press, ISBN 978-1-58488-515-3
- Andrews, Edna (1990), Markedness Theory: the union of asymmetry and semiosis in language, Durham: Duke University Press, ISBN 978-0-8223-0959-8
- Arnold, C. L. (January 1919), "The Number Zero", The Ohio Educational Monthly, 68 (1): 21–22
- Arsham, Hossein (January 2002), "Zero in Four Dimensions: Historical, Psychological, Cultural, and Logical Perspectives", The Pantaneto Forum, archived from the original on 2007-09-25
- Ball, Deborah Loewenberg; Hill, Heather C.; Bass, Hyman (2005), "Knowing Mathematics for Teaching: Who Knows Mathematics Well Enough To Teach Third Grade, and How Can We Decide?", American Educator, hdl:2027.42/65072
- Ball, Deborah Loewenberg; Lewis, Jennifer; Thames, Mark Hoover (2008), "Making mathematics work in school" (PDF), Journal for Research in Mathematics Education, M14: 13–44 and 195–200
- Barbeau, Edward Joseph (2003), Polynomials, Springer, ISBN 978-0-387-40627-5
- Baroody, Arthur; Coslick, Ronald (1998), Fostering Children's Mathematical Power: An Investigative Approach to K-8, Lawrence Erlbaum Associates, ISBN 978-0-8058-3105-4
- Berlinghoff, William P.; Grant, Kerry E.; Skrien, Dale (2001), A Mathematics Sampler: Topics for the Liberal Arts (5th rev. ed.), Rowman & Littlefield, ISBN 978-0-7425-0202-4
- Border, Kim C. (1985), Fixed Point Theorems with Applications to Economics and Game Theory, Cambridge University Press, ISBN 978-0-521-38808-5
- Brisman, Andrew (2004), Mensa Guide to Casino Gambling: Winning Ways, Sterling, ISBN 978-1-4027-1300-2
- Bunch, Bryan H. (1982), Mathematical Fallacies and Paradoxes, Van Nostrand Reinhold, ISBN 978-0-442-24905-2
- Caldwell, Chris K.; Xiong, Yeng (2012-12-27), "What is the Smallest Prime?", Journal of Integer Sequences, 15 (9), arXiv:1209.2007, Bibcode:2012arXiv1209.2007C
- Column 8 readers (2006-03-10), "Column 8", The Sydney Morning Herald (First ed.), p. 18, Factiva SMHH000020060309e23a00049
- Column 8 readers (2006-03-16), "Column 8", The Sydney Morning Herald (First ed.), p. 20, Factiva SMHH000020060315e23g0004z
- Crumpacker, Bunny (2007), Perfect Figures: The Lore of Numbers and How We Learned to Count, Macmillan, ISBN 978-0-312-36005-4
- Cutler, Thomas J. (2008), The Bluejacket's Manual: United States Navy (Centennial ed.), Naval Institute Press, ISBN 978-1-55750-221-6
- Dehaene, Stanislas; Bossini, Serge; Giraux, Pascal (1993), "The mental representation of parity and numerical magnitude" (PDF), Journal of Experimental Psychology: General, 122 (3): 371–396, doi:10.1037/0096-3445.122.3.371, archived from the original (PDF) on 2011-07-19
- Devlin, Keith (April 1985), "The golden age of mathematics", New Scientist, 106 (1452)
- Diagram Group (1983), The Official World Encyclopedia of Sports and Games, Paddington Press, ISBN 978-0-448-22202-8
- Dickerson, David S.; Pitman, Damien J. (July 2012), Tai-Yih Tso (ed.), "Advanced college-level students' categorization and use of mathematical definitions" (PDF), Proceedings of the 36th Conference of the International Group for the Psychology of Mathematics Education, 2: 187–195
- Dummit, David S.; Foote, Richard M. (1999), Abstract Algebra (2e ed.), New York, USA: Wiley, ISBN 978-0-471-36857-1
- Educational Testing Service (2009), Mathematical Conventions for the Quantitative Reasoning Measure of the GRE revised General Test (PDF), Educational Testing Service
- Freudenthal, Hans (1983), Didactical phenomenology of mathematical structures, Dordrecht, Netherlands: Reidel
- Frobisher, Len (1999), "Primary School Children's Knowledge of Odd and Even Numbers", in Anthony Orton (ed.), Pattern in the Teaching and Learning of Mathematics, London, UK: Cassell, pp. 31–48
- Gouvêa, Fernando Quadros (1997), p-adic numbers: an introduction (2nd ed.), Springer-Verlag, ISBN 978-3-540-62911-5
- Gowers, Timothy (2002), Mathematics: A Very Short Introduction, Oxford University Press, ISBN 978-0-19-285361-5
- Graduate Management Admission Council (September 2005), The Official Guide for GMAT Review (11th ed.), McLean, Virginia, USA: Graduate Management Admission Council, ISBN 978-0-9765709-0-5
- Grimes, Joseph E. (1975), The Thread of Discourse, Walter de Gruyter, ISBN 978-90-279-3164-1
- Hartsfield, Nora; Ringel, Gerhard (2003), Pearls in Graph Theory: A Comprehensive Introduction, Mineola, New York, USA: Courier Dover, ISBN 978-0-486-43232-8
- Hill, Heather C.; Blunk, Merrie L.; Charalambous, Charalambos Y.; Lewis, Jennifer M.; Phelps, Geoffrey C.; Sleep, Laurie; Ball, Deborah Loewenberg (2008), "Mathematical Knowledge for Teaching and the Mathematical Quality of Instruction: An Exploratory Study", Cognition and Instruction, 26 (4): 430–511, doi:10.1080/07370000802177235
- Hohmann, George (2007-10-25), "Companies let market determine new name", Charleston Daily Mail, p. P1C, Factiva CGAZ000020071027e3ap0001l
- Kaplan Staff (2004), Kaplan SAT 2400, 2005 Edition, Simon and Schuster, ISBN 978-0-7432-6035-0
- Keith, Annie (2006), "Mathematical Argument in a Second Grade Class: Generating and Justifying Generalized Statements about Odd and Even Numbers", Teachers Engaged in Research: Inquiry in Mathematics Classrooms, Grades Pre-K-2, IAP, ISBN 978-1-59311-495-4
- Krantz, Steven George (2001), Dictionary of algebra, arithmetic, and trigonometry, CRC Press, ISBN 978-1-58488-052-3
- Levenson, Esther; Tsamir, Pessia; Tirosh, Dina (2007), "Neither even nor odd: Sixth grade students' dilemmas regarding the parity of zero", The Journal of Mathematical Behavior, 26 (2): 83–95, doi:10.1016/j.jmathb.2007.05.004
- Lichtenberg, Betty Plunkett (November 1972), "Zero is an even number", The Arithmetic Teacher, 19 (7): 535–538, doi:10.5951/AT.19.7.0535
- Lorentz, Richard J. (1994), Recursive Algorithms, Intellect Books, ISBN 978-1-56750-037-0
- Lovas, William; Pfenning, Frank (2008-01-22), "A Bidirectional Refinement Type System for LF", Electronic Notes in Theoretical Computer Science, 196: 113–128, doi:10.1016/j.entcs.2007.09.021
- Lovász, László; Pelikán, József; Vesztergombi, Katalin L. (2003), Discrete Mathematics: Elementary and Beyond, Springer, ISBN 978-0-387-95585-8
- Morgan, Frank (2001-04-05), "Old Coins", Frank Morgan's Math Chat, The Mathematical Association of America, archived from the original on 2009-01-08
- Nipkow, Tobias; Paulson, Lawrence C.; Wenzel, Markus (2002), Isabelle/Hol: A Proof Assistant for Higher-Order Logic, Springer, ISBN 978-3-540-43376-7
- Nuerk, Hans-Christoph; Iversen, Wiebke; Willmes, Klaus (July 2004), "Notational modulation of the SNARC and the MARC (linguistic markedness of response codes) effect", The Quarterly Journal of Experimental Psychology A, 57 (5): 835–863, doi:10.1080/02724980343000512, PMID 15204120, S2CID 10672272
- Partee, Barbara Hall (1978), Fundamentals of Mathematics for Linguistics, Dordrecht, Netherlands: D. Reidel, ISBN 978-90-277-0809-0
- Penner, Robert C. (1999), Discrete Mathematics: Proof Techniques and Mathematical Structures, River Edge: World Scientific, ISBN 978-981-02-4088-2
- Salzmann, Helmut; Grundhöfer, Theo; Hähl, Hermann; Löwen, Rainer (2007), The Classical Fields: Structural Features of the Real and Rational Numbers, Cambridge University Press, ISBN 978-0-521-86516-6
- Siegel, Robert (1999-11-19), "Analysis: Today's date is signified in abbreviations using only odd numbers. 1-1, 1-9, 1-9-9-9. The next time that happens will be more than a thousand years from now.", All Things Considered, National Public Radio
- Smock, Doug (2006-02-06), "The odd bets: Hines Ward vs. Tiger Woods", Charleston Gazette, p. P1B, Factiva CGAZ000020060207e226000bh
- Snow, Tony (2001-02-23), "Bubba's fools", Jewish World Review
- Sones, Bill; Sones, Rich (2002-05-08), "To hide your age, button your lips", Deseret News, p. C07, archived from the original on 2015-05-08
- Starr, Ross M. (1997), General Equilibrium Theory: An Introduction, Cambridge University Press, ISBN 978-0-521-56473-1
- Steinberg, Neil (1999-11-30), "Even year, odd facts", Chicago Sun-Times (5XS ed.), p. 50, Factiva chi0000020010826dvbu0119h
- Stewart, Mark Alan (2001), 30 Days to the GMAT CAT, Stamford: Thomson, ISBN 978-0-7689-0635-6
- Stingl, Jim (2006-04-05), "01:02:03 04/05/06; We can count on some things in life", Milwaukee Journal Sentinel (Final ed.), p. B1, archived from the original on 2006-04-27
- Tabachnikova, Olga M.; Smith, Geoff C. (2000), Topics in Group Theory, London, UK: Springer, ISBN 978-1-85233-235-8
- The Math Forum participants (2000), "A question around zero", Math Forum » Discussions » History » Historia-Matematica, Drexel University, archived from the original on 2011-06-07
- Turner, Julian (1996-07-13), "Sports Betting – For Lytham Look to the South Pacific", The Guardian, p. 23, Factiva grdn000020011017ds7d00bzg
- Wilden, Anthony; Hammer, Rhonda (1987), The rules are no game: the strategy of communication, Routledge Kegan & Paul, ISBN 978-0-7100-9868-9
- Wise, Stephen (2002), GIS Basics, CRC Press, ISBN 978-0-415-24651-4
- Wong, Samuel Shaw Ming (1997), Computational Methods in Physics and Engineering, World Scientific, ISBN 978-981-02-3043-2
