= Unsolved Problems in Number Theory =

Unsolved Problems in Number Theory may refer to:

- Unsolved problems in mathematics in the field of number theory.
- A book with this title by Richard K. Guy published by Springer Verlag:
  - First edition 1981, 161 pages, ISBN 0-387-90593-6
  - Second edition 1994, 285 pages, ISBN 0-387-94289-0
  - Third edition 2004, 438 pages, ISBN 0-387-20860-7

Books with a similar title include:

- Solved and Unsolved Problems in Number Theory, by Daniel Shanks
  - First edition, 1962
  - Second edition, 1978
  - Third edition, 1985, ISBN 0-8284-1297-9
  - Fourth edition, 1993
- Old and New Unsolved Problems in Plane Geometry and Number Theory, by Victor Klee and Stan Wagon, 1991, ISBN 0-88385-315-9.
