= K. B. Reid =

American mathematician

Kenneth Brooks Reid, Jr.
- Education: University of Illinois at Urbana-Champaign (Ph.D., M.S.); UC Berkeley (B.A.)
- Scientific career
- Fields: Graph theory Combinatorics
- Workplaces: California State University San Marcos; Louisiana State University
- Thesis: Structure in Finite Graphs (1968)
- Doctoral advisor: Ernest Tilden Parker

Kenneth Brooks Reid, Jr. is a graph theorist and the founder faculty (Head 1989) professor at California State University, San Marcos (CSUSM). He specializes in combinatorial mathematics. He is known for his work in tournaments, frequency partitions and aspects of voting theory. He is known (with E. T. Parker) on a disproof of a conjecture on tournaments by Erdős and Moser.

He received his Ph.D. on a dissertation called "Structure in Finite Graphs" from the University of Illinois at Urbana-Champaign in 1968, his advisor was E. T. Parker. Reid is a professor emeritus at Louisiana State University (1968–1989) and has guided students for their Ph.D.s at Baton Rouge.

He is a professor emeritus at CSUSM.

== Selected work ==
- [Book] Disproof of a conjecture of Erdos and Moser on tournaments, KB Reid, ET Parker, ILLINOIS UNIV URBANA - 1964 - oai.dtic.mil
- Domination graphs of tournaments and digraphs, DC Fisher, JR Lundgren, SK Merz, KB Reid - Congressus Numerantium, 1995 - citeseerx.ist.psu.edu
- Tournaments, K.B. Reid, L. W. Beineke - Selected topics in graph theory, 1978
