= Derrick Niederman =

American mathematician

Derrick Corson Niederman is an author, mathematician, game designer, and national squash champion. His most recent game, 36 Cube, has been described by Reuters as "a wolf in sheep's clothing" because its simple design belies the sophisticated mathematical intuition required for the solution. He received a B.A. in mathematics from Yale and a Ph.D. in mathematics from MIT. Dr. Niederman is a math professor at the College of Charleston. In 2025, Niederman founded Wordsmith Games. The flagship game is called Tosswords.

== Published games ==
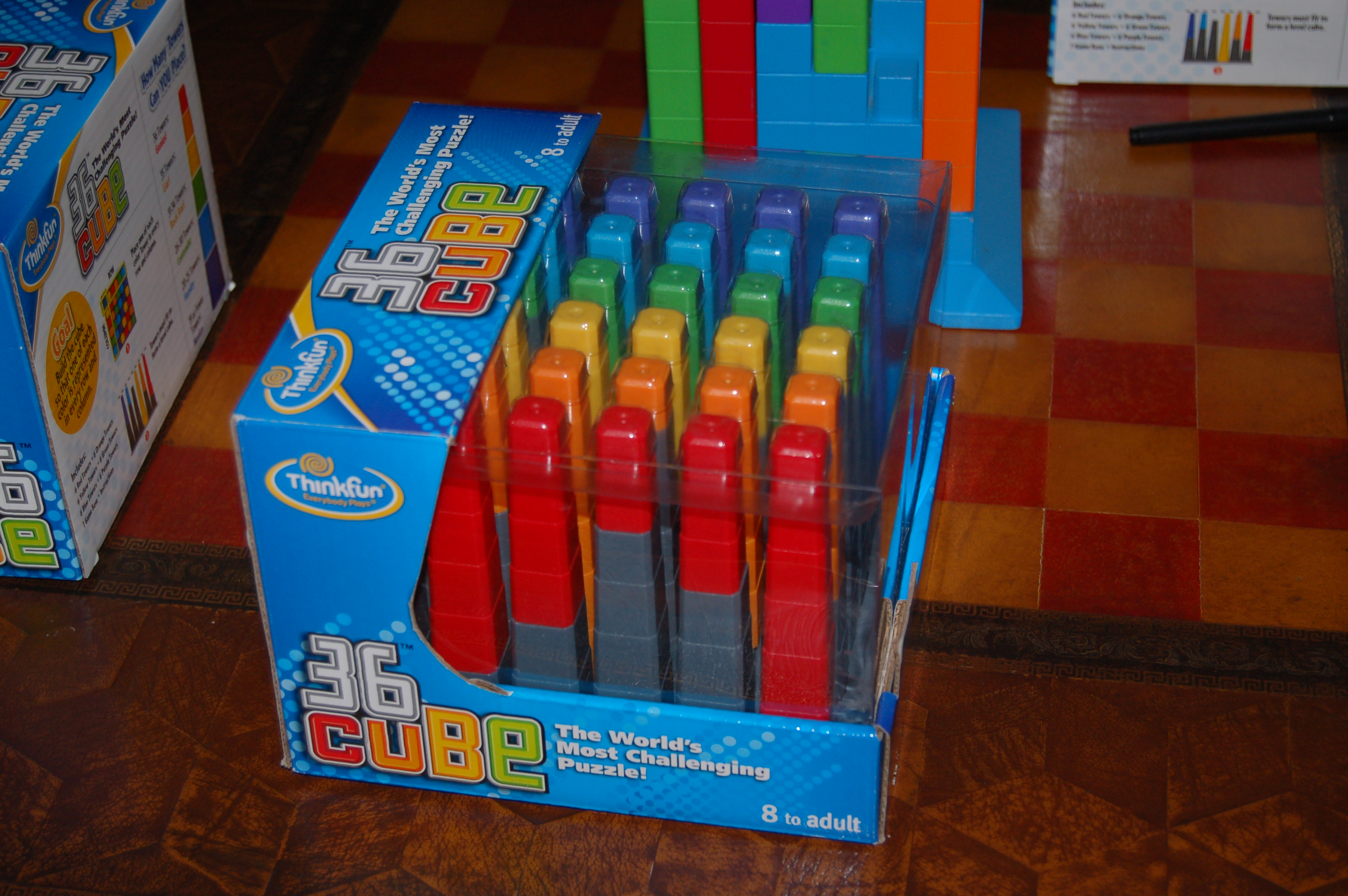
36 Cube

The New York Times Magazine Sunday Crosswords

Niederman has created a number of crossword puzzles and cryptic puzzles for The New York Times Magazine since the early 1980s. His October 5, 1997 crossword puzzle "Baseball by the Numbers" is often included in crossword puzzle anthologies.

Puzzle and Game Books

Dr. Niederman has also published other game and puzzle books.

- The Puzzler's Dilemma (2012)
- Math Puzzles for the Clever Mind (2006)
- Hard to Solve Math Puzzles (2006)
- Classic Brain Twisters (2005)
- Mind-Stretching Math Puzzles (2005)
- Sit & Solve Brainteasers (2003)
- Hard-to-Solve Math Puzzles (2001)
- Giant Book of Whodunit Puzzles and Giant Book of Puzzles for Young Einsteins (2001)
- Pocket Puzzlers: Whodunits (2000)
- The Little Giant Book of Math Puzzles (2000)

36 Cube

The 36 Cube is a puzzle that requires the arrangement of "towers" in a 6x6 square block so that each color appears only once in each row and column, all the same height. The completed puzzle will then be a cube. Jerry Slocum, a puzzle historian and one of the world's top puzzle collectors, finds 36 Cube one of the most engaging puzzles in his extensive collection. "My first impression was that it was quite a beautiful puzzle. Its three-dimensional character and colors are very striking. Out of the 30,000 puzzles I own, it's quite distinctive and unique." Dr. Niederman came up with the idea while writing a book on whole numbers, after unearthing a mathematical supposition from the 18th century. "It struck me as the basis for a potentially great 3-D puzzle, and what eventually became 36 Cube."

Wordsmith Games

Niederman founded Wordsmith Games in early 2025; its flagship game, called Tosswords, began production in the fall of that year.
