= The Banach–Tarski Paradox (book) =

Book about the mathematical paradox

- First edition
- Author: Stan Wagon
- Series: Encyclopedia of Mathematics and its Applications
- Subject: The Banach–Tarski paradox
- Publisher: Cambridge University Press
- Publication date: 1985

The Banach–Tarski Paradox is a book in mathematics on the Banach–Tarski paradox, the fact that a unit ball can be partitioned into a finite number of subsets and reassembled to form two unit balls. It was written by Stan Wagon and published in 1985 by the Cambridge University Press as volume 24 of their Encyclopedia of Mathematics and its Applications book series. A second printing in 1986 added two pages as an addendum, and a 1993 paperback printing added a new preface. In 2016 the Cambridge University Press published a second edition, adding Grzegorz Tomkowicz as a co-author, as volume 163 of the same series. The Basic Library List Committee of the Mathematical Association of America has recommended its inclusion in undergraduate mathematics libraries.

== Topics ==
The Banach–Tarski paradox, proved by Stefan Banach and Alfred Tarski in 1924, states that it is possible to partition a three-dimensional unit ball into finitely many pieces and reassemble them into two unit balls, a single ball of larger or smaller area, or any other bounded set with a non-empty interior. Although it is a mathematical theorem, it is called a paradox because it is so counter-intuitive; in the preface to the book, Jan Mycielski calls it the most surprising result in mathematics. It is closely related to measure theory and the non-existence of a measure on all subsets of three-dimensional space, invariant under all congruences of space, and to the theory of paradoxical sets in free groups and the representation of these groups by three-dimensional rotations, used in the proof of the paradox. The topic of the book is the Banach–Tarski paradox, its proof, and the many related results that have since become known.

The book is divided into two parts, the first on the existence of paradoxical decompositions and the second on conditions that prevent their existence. After two chapters of background material, the first part proves the Banach–Tarski paradox itself, considers higher-dimensional spaces and non-Euclidean geometry, studies the number of pieces necessary for a paradoxical decomposition, and finds analogous results to the Banach–Tarski paradox for one- and two-dimensional sets. The second part includes a related theorem of Tarski that congruence-invariant finitely-additive measures prevent the existence of paradoxical decompositions, a theorem that Lebesgue measure is the only such measure on the Lebesgue measurable sets, material on amenable groups, connections to the axiom of choice and the Hahn–Banach theorem. Three appendices describe Euclidean groups, Jordan measure, and a collection of open problems.

The second edition adds material on several recent results in this area, in many cases inspired by the first edition of the book. Trevor Wilson proved the existence of a continuous motion from the one-ball assembly to the two-ball assembly, keeping the sets of the partition disjoint at all times; this question had been posed by de Groot in the first edition of the book. Miklós Laczkovich solved Tarski's circle-squaring problem, asking for a dissection of a disk to a square of the same area, in 1990. And Edward Marczewski had asked in 1930 whether the Banach–Tarski paradox could be achieved using only Baire sets; a positive answer was found in 1994 by Randall Dougherty and Matthew Foreman.

== Audience and reception ==
The book is written at a level accessible to mathematics graduate students, but provides a survey of research in this area that should also be useful to more advanced researchers. The beginning parts of the book, including its proof of the Banach–Tarski paradox, should also be readable by undergraduate mathematicians.

Reviewer Włodzimierz Bzyl writes that "this beautiful book is written with care and is certainly worth reading". Reviewer John J. Watkins writes that the first edition of the book "became the classic text on paradoxical mathematics" and that the second edition "exceeds any possible expectation I might have had for expanding a book I already deeply treasured".

== See also ==
- List of paradoxes
- History of mathematics
