= Mutually orthogonal Latin squares =

Mathematical problem

In combinatorics, two Latin squares of the same size (order) are said to be orthogonal if when superimposed the ordered paired entries in the positions are all distinct. A set of Latin squares, all of the same order, all pairs of which are orthogonal is called a set of mutually orthogonal Latin squares. This concept of orthogonality in combinatorics is strongly related to the concept of blocking in statistics, which ensures that independent variables are truly independent with no hidden confounding correlations. "Orthogonal" is thus synonymous with "independent" in that knowing one variable's value gives no further information about another variable's likely value.

An older term for a pair of orthogonal Latin squares is Graeco-Latin square, introduced by Euler.

== Graeco-Latin squares ==
A Graeco-Latin square or Euler square or pair of orthogonal Latin squares of order n over two sets S and T (which may be the same), each consisting of n symbols, is an n × n arrangement of cells, each cell containing an ordered pair (s, t), where s is in S and t is in T, such that every row and every column contains each element of S and each element of T exactly once, and that no two cells contain the same ordered pair.

Graeco-Latin squares (pairs of orthogonal Latin squares)

Order 3

Order 4

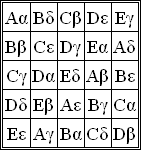
Order 5

The arrangement of the s-coordinates by themselves (which may be thought of as Latin characters) and of the t-coordinates (the Greek characters) each forms a Latin square. A Graeco-Latin square can therefore be decomposed into two orthogonal Latin squares. Orthogonality here means that every pair (s, t) from the Cartesian product S × T occurs exactly once.

Orthogonal Latin squares were studied in detail by Leonhard Euler, who took the two sets to be S = {A, B, C, ...}, the first n upper-case letters from the Latin alphabet, and T = {α , β, γ, ...}, the first n lower-case letters from the Greek alphabet—hence the name Graeco-Latin square.

=== Existence ===
When a Graeco-Latin square is viewed as a pair of orthogonal Latin squares, each of the Latin squares is said to have an orthogonal mate. In an arbitrary Latin square, a selection of positions, one in each row and one in each column whose entries are all distinct is called a transversal of that square. Consider one symbol in a Graeco-Latin square. The positions containing this symbol must all be in different rows and columns, and furthermore the other symbol in these positions must all be distinct. Hence, when viewed as a pair of Latin squares, the positions containing one symbol in the first square correspond to a transversal in the second square (and vice versa).

A given Latin square of order n possesses an orthogonal mate if and only if it has n disjoint transversals.

The Cayley table (without borders) of any group of odd order forms a Latin square which possesses an orthogonal mate.

Thus Graeco-Latin squares exist for all odd orders as there are groups that exist of these orders. Such Graeco-Latin squares are said to be group based.

Euler was able to construct Graeco-Latin squares of orders that are multiples of four, and seemed to be aware of the following result.

Unable to find a solution for a 6 square, and knowing that 2 square had no possible solution, Euler conjectured that no group based Graeco-Latin squares could exist if the order was an odd multiple of two (that is, equal to 4k + 2 for some positive integer k), that is, 2, 6, 10, 14, 18, 22 and so on. Later on, though, it was proven that only 2 and 6 didn't have solutions.

=== History ===
Although Euler is recognized for his original mathematical treatment of the subject, orthogonal Latin squares predate him. In the form of an old puzzle involving playing cards, the construction of a 4 × 4 set was published by Jacques Ozanam in 1725. The problem was to take all aces, kings, queens and jacks from a standard deck of cards, and arrange them in a 4 × 4 grid such that each row and each column contained all four suits as well as one of each face value. This problem has several solutions.

A common variant of this problem was to arrange the 16 cards so that, in addition to the row and column constraints, each diagonal contains all four face values and all four suits as well.

According to Martin Gardner, who featured this variant of the problem in his November 1959 Mathematical Games column, the number of distinct solutions was incorrectly stated to be 72 by Rouse Ball. This mistake persisted for many years until the correct value of 144 was found by Kathleen Ollerenshaw. Each of the 144 solutions has eight reflections and rotations, giving 1152 solutions in total. The 144×8 solutions can be categorized into the following two equivalence classes:

Solution	Normal form
Solution #1	A♠ K♥ Q♦ J♣ Q♣ J♦ A♥ K♠ J♥ Q♠ K♣ A♦ K♦ A♣ J♠ Q♥
Solution #2	A♠ K♥ Q♦ J♣ J♦ Q♣ K♠ A♥ K♣ A♦ J♥ Q♠ Q♥ J♠ A♣ K♦

For each of the two solutions, 24^{2} = 576 solutions can be derived by permuting the four suits and the four face values, independently. No permutation will convert the two solutions into each other, because suits and face values are different.

==== Thirty-six officers problem ====
Generalisation of the 36 officers puzzle for 1 to 8 ranks (chess pieces) and regiments (colours) – cases 2 and 6 have no solutions

A problem similar to the card problem above was circulating in St. Petersburg in the late 1700s and, according to folklore, Catherine the Great asked Euler to solve it, since he was residing at her court at the time. This problem is known as the thirty-six officers problem, and Euler introduced it as follows:

A very curious question, which has exercised for some time the ingenuity of many people, has involved me in the following studies, which seem to open a new field of analysis, in particular the study of combinations. The question revolves around arranging 36 officers to be drawn from 6 different regiments so that they are ranged in a square so that in each line (both horizontal and vertical) there are 6 officers of different ranks and different regiments.

— Leonhard Euler

Redrawing of the November 1959 Scientific American order-10 Graeco-Latin square – in the SVG file, hover over the letters to hide the background and vice versa

Euler was unable to solve the problem, but in this work he demonstrated methods for constructing Graeco-Latin squares where n is odd or a multiple of 4. Observing that no order two square exists and being unable to construct an order six square, he conjectured that none exist for any oddly even number n ≡ 2 (mod 4). The non-existence of order six squares was confirmed in 1901 by Gaston Tarry through a proof by exhaustion. However, Euler's conjecture resisted solution until the late 1950s, but the problem has led to important work in combinatorics.

In early 1959, Raj Chandra Bose and S. S. Shrikhande constructed some counterexamples (dubbed the Euler spoilers) of order 22 using mathematical insights. Their work was inspired by work done by Ernest Parker, and based on their work, within days Parker found a counterexample of order 10 using a one-hour computer search on a UNIVAC 1206 Military Computer while working at the UNIVAC division of Remington Rand (this was one of the earliest combinatorics problems solved on a digital computer).

In April 1959, Parker, Bose, and Shrikhande presented their paper showing Euler's conjecture to be false for all n ≥ 7. Thus, Graeco-Latin squares exist for all orders n > 1 except n = 2, 6. In the November 1959 edition of Scientific American, Martin Gardner published this result. The front cover is the 10 × 10 refutation of Euler's conjecture.

==== Thirty-six entangled officers problem ====
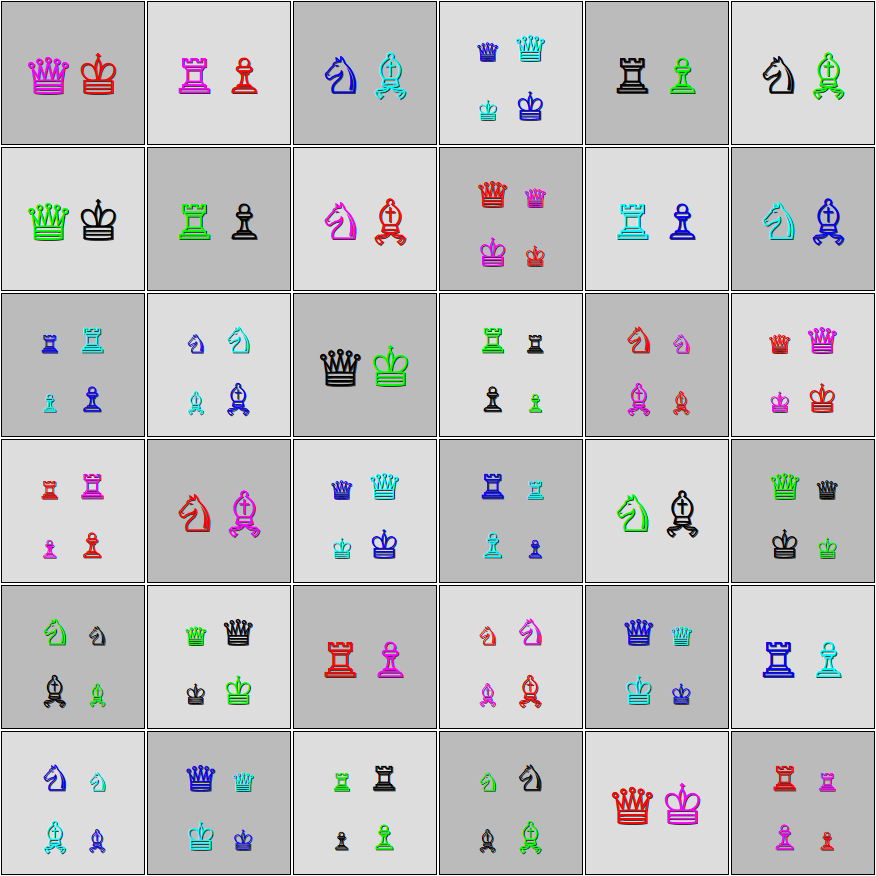
A quantum solution to a classically impossible problem. If the chess pieces are quantum states in a superposition, then a pair of orthogonal quantum Latin squares of size 6 exists. The relative sizes of chess pieces denote the contribution of the corresponding quantum states.

Extensions of mutually orthogonal Latin squares to the quantum domain have been studied since 2017. In these designs, instead of the uniqueness of symbols, the elements of an array are quantum states that must be orthogonal to each other in rows and columns. In 2021, an Indian-Polish team of physicists (Rather, Burchardt, Bruzda, Rajchel-Mieldzioć, Lakshminarayan, and Życzkowski) found an array of quantum states that provides an example of mutually orthogonal quantum Latin squares of size 6; or, equivalently, an arrangement of 36 officers that are entangled. This setup solves a generalization of the 36 Euler's officers problem, as well as provides a new quantum error detection code, allowing to encode a 6-level system into a three 6-level system that certifies occurrence of one error.

==== Prior and independent work: Choi Seok-jeong ====
What makes the history of orthogonal Latin squares particularly remarkable is that the concept was not discovered once, but twice — independently, centuries apart, and worlds away. Choi Seok-jeong (최석정; 崔錫鼎; 1646–1715) was a leading statesman of the Joseon dynasty of Korea, serving multiple terms as Yeonguijeong (영의정), the highest ministerial office in the kingdom, equivalent to Prime Minister. Yet alongside his political career, he produced mathematical work of extraordinary depth. In his treatise Gusuryak (구수략; 九數略), published around 1700, Choi constructed a pair of orthogonal Latin squares of order 9 — a feat that predates Leonhard Euler's work on the subject by at least 67 years. Choi arrived at this structure through an entirely different intellectual tradition — rooted in Neo-Confucianism, the philosophy of the I Ching, and classical Eastern mathematics — with no known connection to contemporary European scholarship. His construction, named Gugumosubyon-gungyang-do (구구모수변궁양도; 九九母數變宮陽圖) in the Gusuryak, was applied to produce a magic square of order 9 in which every row, column, and diagonal sums to 369. Today, Choi is regarded by scholars as the greatest mathematician of the Joseon period — a rare figure who reached the heights of both political power and mathematical achievement.

== Examples of mutually orthogonal Latin squares (MOLS) ==
A set of Latin squares of the same order such that every pair of squares are orthogonal (that is, form a Graeco-Latin square) is called a set of mutually orthogonal Latin squares (or pairwise orthogonal Latin squares) and usually abbreviated as MOLS or MOLS(n) when the order is made explicit.

For example, a set of MOLS(4) is given by:

$$\begin{matrix} 1&2&3&4 \\ 2&1&4&3\\ 3&4&1&2\\4&3&2&1 \end{matrix}\qquad\qquad \begin{matrix} 1&2&3&4 \\ 4&3&2&1 \\2&1&4&3 \\3&4&1&2 \end{matrix}\qquad\qquad\begin{matrix}1&2&3&4 \\3&4&1&2\\4&3&2&1\\2&1&4&3\end{matrix}.$$

And a set of MOLS(5):

$$\begin{matrix}1&2&3&4&5 \\2&3&4&5&1\\3&4&5&1&2\\4&5&1&2&3\\5&1&2&3&4\end{matrix} \qquad\begin{matrix}1&2&3&4&5\\3&4&5&1&2\\5&1&2&3&4\\2&3&4&5&1\\4&5&1&2&3\end{matrix}
\qquad\begin{matrix}1&2&3&4&5\\5&1&2&3&4\\4&5&1&2&3\\3&4&5&1&2\\2&3&4&5&1\end{matrix}
\qquad\begin{matrix}1&2&3&4&5\\4&5&1&2&3\\2&3&4&5&1\\5&1&2&3&4\\3&4&5&1&2\end{matrix}.$$

While it is possible to represent MOLS in a "compound" matrix form similar to the Graeco-Latin squares, for instance,

1,1,1,1	2,2,2,2	3,3,3,3	4,4,4,4	5,5,5,5
2,3,5,4	3,4,1,5	4,5,2,1	5,1,3,2	1,2,4,3
3,5,4,2	4,1,5,3	5,2,1,4	1,3,2,5	2,4,3,1
4,2,3,5	5,3,4,1	1,4,5,2	2,5,1,3	3,1,2,4
5,4,2,3	1,5,3,4	2,1,4,5	3,2,5,1	4,3,1,2

for the MOLS(5) example above, it is more typical to compactly represent the MOLS as an orthogonal array (see below).

In the examples of MOLS given so far, the same alphabet (symbol set) has been used for each square, but this is not necessary as the Graeco-Latin squares show. In fact, totally different symbol sets can be used for each square of the set of MOLS. For example,

Any two of text, foreground color, background color and typeface form a pair of orthogonal Latin squares:
fjords	jawbox	phlegm	qiviut	zincky
zincky	fjords	jawbox	phlegm	qiviut
qiviut	zincky	fjords	jawbox	phlegm
phlegm	qiviut	zincky	fjords	jawbox
jawbox	phlegm	qiviut	zincky	fjords

is a representation of the compounded MOLS(5) example above where the four MOLS have the following alphabets, respectively:

- the background color: black, maroon, teal, navy, and silver
- the foreground color: white, red, lime, blue, and yellow
- the text: fjords, jawbox, phlegm, qiviut, and zincky
- the typeface family: serif, sans-serif, monospaced, cursive, and slab-serif.

The above table therefore allows for testing five values in each of four different dimensions in only 25 observations instead of 625 (= 5^{4}) observations required in a full factorial design. Since the five words cover all 26 letters of the alphabet between them, the table allows for examining each letter of the alphabet in five different typefaces and color combinations.

=== The number of mutually orthogonal Latin squares ===
The mutual orthogonality property of a set of MOLS is unaffected by

- Permuting the rows of all the squares simultaneously,
- Permuting the columns of all the squares simultaneously, and
- Permuting the entries in any square, independently.

Using these operations, any set of MOLS can be put into standard form, meaning that the first row of every square is identical and normally put in some natural order, and one square has its first column also in this order. The MOLS(4) and MOLS(5) examples at the start of this section have been put in standard form.

By putting a set of MOLS(n) in standard form and examining the entries in the second row and first column of each square, it can be seen that no more than n − 1 squares can exist. A set of n − 1 MOLS(n) is called a complete set of MOLS. Complete sets are known to exist when n is a prime number or power of a prime (see Finite field construction below). However, the number of MOLS that may exist for a given order n is not known for general n, and is an area of research in combinatorics.

==== Projective planes ====
A set of n − 1 MOLS(n) is equivalent to a finite affine plane of order n (see Nets below). As every finite affine plane is uniquely extendable to a finite projective plane of the same order, this equivalence can also be expressed in terms of the existence of these projective planes.

As mentioned above, complete sets of MOLS(n) exist if n is a prime or prime power, so projective planes of such orders exist. Finite projective planes with an order different from these, and thus complete sets of MOLS of such orders, are not known to exist.

The only general result on the non-existence of finite projective planes is the Bruck–Ryser theorem, which says that if a projective plane of order n exists and n ≡ 1 (mod 4) or n ≡ 2 (mod 4), then n must be the sum of two (integer) squares. This rules out projective planes of orders 6 and 14 for instance, but does not guarantee the existence of a plane when n satisfies the condition. In particular, n = 10 satisfies the conditions, but no projective plane of order 10 exists, as was shown by a very long computer search, which in turn implies that there do not exist nine MOLS of order 10.

No other existence results are known. As of 2020, the smallest order for which the existence of a complete set of MOLS is undetermined is 12.

==== McNeish's theorem ====
The minimum number of MOLS(n) is known to be 2 for all n except for n = 2 or 6, where it is 1. However, more can be said, namely,

MacNeish's Theorem: If $n = p_1^{\alpha_1}p_2^{\alpha_2}\cdots p_r^{\alpha_r}$ is the factorization of the integer n into powers of distinct primes $p_1,p_2,\cdots,p_r$ then

the minimum number of MOLS(n) $\ge \underset{i}{\operatorname{min}} \{p_i^{\alpha_i} - 1 \}.$

i.e. the minimum number of MOLS(n) is ≥ k−1, where k is the largest number such that n is k-powerrough number.

MacNeish's Theorem not only proved this theorem, but also falsely proved Euler's conjecture that no group based Graeco-Latin squares could exist if the order was an odd multiple of two, and then he conjectured that MOLS(n) = k−1 (where k is the largest number such that n is k-powerrough) for all number n.

MacNeish's theorem does not give a very good lower bound, for instance if n ≡ 2 (mod 4), that is, there is a single 2 in the prime factorization, the theorem gives a lower bound of 1, which is beaten if n > 6. On the other hand, it does give the correct value when n is a power of a prime.

For general composite numbers, the number of MOLS is not known. The first few values starting with n = 2, 3, 4... are 1, 2, 3, 4, 1, 6, 7, 8, ... (sequence A001438 in the OEIS).

The smallest case for which the exact number of MOLS(n) is not known is n = 10. From the Graeco-Latin square construction, there must be at least two, and from the non-existence of a projective plane of order 10, there are fewer than nine. In fact, Shrikhande proved that (except for n = 4) the existence of n – 3 MOLS implies the existence of n - 1 MOLS (and thus of a projective plane), so there are fewer than seven MOLS of order 10. No set of three MOLS(10) has ever been found even though many researchers have attempted to discover such a set.

For large enough n, the number of MOLS is greater than $\sqrt[14.8]{n}$ (the minimum number was originaly $\sqrt[91]{n}$, then $\sqrt[17]{n}-2$, then $\sqrt[14.8]{n}$), thus for every k, there are only a finite number of n such that the number of MOLS is k. Moreover, the minimum is 6 for all n > 90.

==== Finite field construction ====
A complete set of MOLS(q) exists whenever q is a prime or prime power. This follows from a construction that is based on a finite field GF(q), which only exist if q is a prime or prime power. The multiplicative group of GF(q) is a cyclic group, and so, has a generator, λ, meaning that all the non-zero elements of the field can be expressed as distinct powers of λ. Name the q elements of GF(q) as follows:

α_{0} = 0, α_{1} = 1, α_{2} = λ, α_{3} = λ^{2}, ..., α_{q-1} = λ^{q-2}.

Now, λ^{q-1} = 1 and the rule for the product of two non-zero elements in terms of the α's is α_{i}α_{j} = α_{t}, where t – 1 = i – 1 + j – 1 (mod q – 1). The Latin squares are constructed as follows, the (i, j)th entry in Latin square L_{r} (with r ≠ 0) is L_{r}(i,j) = α_{i} + α_{r}α_{j}, where all the operations occur in GF(q). In the case that the field is a prime field (q = p a prime), where the field elements are represented in the usual way, as the integers modulo p, the naming convention above can be dropped and the construction rule can be simplified to L_{r}(i,j) = i + rj, where r ≠ 0 and i, j and r are elements of GF(p) and all operations are in GF(p). The MOLS(4) and MOLS(5) examples above arose from this construction, although with a change of alphabet.

Not all complete sets of MOLS arise from this construction. The projective plane that is associated with the complete set of MOLS obtained from this field construction is a special type, a Desarguesian projective plane. There exist non-Desarguesian projective planes and their corresponding complete sets of MOLS can not be obtained from finite fields.

=== Orthogonal array ===
An orthogonal array, OA(k,n), of strength two and index one is an n^{2} × k array A (k ≥ 2 and n ≥ 1, integers) with entries from a set of size n such that within any two columns of A (strength), every ordered pair of symbols appears in exactly one row of A (index).

An OA(s + 2, n) is equivalent to s MOLS(n). For example, the MOLS(4) example given above and repeated here,

$$\begin{matrix} 1&2&3&4 \\ 2&1&4&3\\ 3&4&1&2\\4&3&2&1\\& L_1&& \end{matrix}\qquad\qquad \begin{matrix} 1&2&3&4 \\ 4&3&2&1 \\2&1&4&3 \\3&4&1&2 \\& L_2&&\end{matrix}\qquad\qquad\begin{matrix}1&2&3&4 \\3&4&1&2\\4&3&2&1\\2&1&4&3\\& L_3&&\end{matrix}$$

can be used to form an OA(5,4):

r	c	L_{1}	L_{2}	L_{3}
1	1	1	1	1
1	2	2	2	2
1	3	3	3	3
1	4	4	4	4
2	1	2	4	3
2	2	1	3	4
2	3	4	2	1
2	4	3	1	2
3	1	3	2	4
3	2	4	1	3
3	3	1	4	2
3	4	2	3	1
4	1	4	3	2
4	2	3	4	1
4	3	2	1	4
4	4	1	2	3

where the entries in the columns labeled r and c denote the row and column of a position in a square and the rest of the row for fixed r and c values is filled with the entry in that position in each of the Latin squares. This process is reversible; given an OA(s,n) with s ≥ 3, choose any two columns to play the r and c roles and then fill out the Latin squares with the entries in the remaining columns.

More general orthogonal arrays represent generalizations of the concept of MOLS, such as mutually orthogonal Latin cubes.

=== Nets ===
A (geometric) (k,n)-net is a set of n^{2} elements called points and a set of kn subsets called lines or blocks each of size n with the property that two distinct lines intersect in at most one point. Moreover, the lines can be partitioned into k parallel classes (no two of its lines meet) each containing n lines.

An (n + 1, n)-net is an affine plane of order n.

A set of k MOLS(n) is equivalent to a (k + 2, n)-net.

To construct a (k + 2, n)-net from k MOLS(n), represent the MOLS as an orthogonal array, OA(k + 2, n) (see above). The ordered pairs of entries in each row of the orthogonal array in the columns labeled r and c, will be considered to be the coordinates of the n^{2} points of the net. Each other column (that is, Latin square) will be used to define the lines in a parallel class. The n lines determined by the column labeled L_{i} will be denoted by l_{ij}. The points on l_{ij} will be those with coordinates corresponding to the rows where the entry in the L_{i} column is j. There are two additional parallel classes, corresponding to the r and c columns. The lines r_{j} and c_{j} consist of the points whose first coordinates are j, or second coordinates are j respectively. This construction is reversible.

For example, the OA(5,4) in the above section can be used to construct a (5,4)-net (an affine plane of order 4). The points on each line are given by (each row below is a parallel class of lines):

l_{11}:	(1,1) (2,2) (3,3) (4,4)	l_{12}:	(1,2) (2,1) (3,4) (4,3)	l_{13}:	(1,3) (2,4) (3,1) (4,2)	l_{14}:	(1,4) (2,3) (3,2) (4,1)
l_{21}:	(1,1) (2,4) (3,2) (4,3)	l_{22}:	(1,2) (2,3) (3,1) (4,4)	l_{23}:	(1,3) (2,2) (3,4) (4,1)	l_{24}:	(1,4) (2,1) (3,3) (4,2)
l_{31}:	(1,1) (2,3) (3,4) (4,2)	l_{32}:	(1,2) (2,4) (3,3) (4,1)	l_{33}:	(1,3) (2,1) (3,2) (4,4)	l_{34}:	(1,4) (2,2) (3,1) (4,3)
r_{1}:	(1,1) (1,2) (1,3) (1,4)	r_{2}:	(2,1) (2,2) (2,3) (2,4)	r_{3}:	(3,1) (3,2) (3,3) (3,4)	r_{4}:	(4,1) (4,2) (4,3) (4,4)
c_{1}:	(1,1) (2,1) (3,1) (4,1)	c_{2}:	(1,2) (2,2) (3,2) (4,2)	c_{3}:	(1,3) (2,3) (3,3) (4,3)	c_{4}:	(1,4) (2,4) (3,4) (4,4)

=== Transversal designs ===
A transversal design with k groups of size n and index λ, denoted T[k, λ; n], is a triple (X, G, B) where:

- X is a set of kn varieties;
- G = {G_{1}, G_{2}, ..., G_{k}} is a family of k n-sets (called groups, but not in the algebraic sense) which form a partition of X;
- B is a family of k-sets (called blocks) of varieties such that each k-set in B intersects each group G_{i} in precisely one variety, and any pair of varieties which belong to different groups occur together in precisely λ blocks in B.

The existence of a T[k,1;n] design is equivalent to the existence of k-2 MOLS(n).

A transversal design T[k,1;n] is the dual incidence structure of an (k,n)-net. That is, it has nk points and n^{2} blocks. Each point is in n blocks; each block contains k points. The points fall into k equivalence classes (groups) of size n so that two points in the same group are not contained in a block while two points in different groups belong to exactly one block.

For example, using the (5,4)-net of the previous section we can construct a T[5,1;4] transversal design. The block associated with the point (i, j) of the net will be denoted b_{ij}. The points of the design will be obtained from the following scheme: r_{i} ↔ i, c_{j} ↔ 5j, and l_{ij} ↔ 5i + j. The points of the design are thus denoted by the integers 1, ..., 20. The blocks of the design are:

b_{11}:	6 11 16 1 5	b_{22}:	6 13 19 2 10	b_{33}:	6 14 17 3 15	b_{44}:	6 12 18 4 20
b_{12}:	7 12 17 1 10	b_{21}:	7 14 18 2 5	b_{34}:	7 13 16 3 20	b_{43}:	7 11 19 4 15
b_{13}:	8 13 18 1 15	b_{24}:	8 11 17 2 20	b_{31}:	8 12 19 3 5	b_{42}:	8 14 16 4 10
b_{14}:	9 14 19 1 20	b_{23}:	9 12 16 2 15	b_{32}:	9 11 18 3 10	b_{41}:	9 13 17 4 5

The five "groups" are:

6 7 8 9
11 12 13 14
16 17 18 19
1 2 3 4
5 10 15 20

=== Graph theory ===
A set of k MOLS(n) is equivalent to an edge-partition of the complete (k + 2)-partite graph K_{n,...,n} into complete subgraphs of order k + 2.

== Applications ==
Mutually orthogonal Latin squares have a great variety of applications. They are used as a starting point for constructions in the statistical design of experiments, tournament scheduling, and error correcting and detecting codes. Euler's interest in Graeco-Latin squares arose from his desire to construct magic squares. The French writer Georges Perec structured his 1978 novel Life: A User's Manual around a 10×10 Graeco-Latin square.

== See also ==
- 36 cube
- Block design
- Blocking (statistics)
- Combinatorial design
