= Thickness (graph theory) =

Number of planar subgraphs to cover a graph

In graph theory, the thickness of a graph G is the minimum number of planar graphs into which the edges of G can be partitioned. That is, if there exists a collection of k planar graphs, all having the same set of vertices, such that the union of these planar graphs is G, then the thickness of G is at most k. In other words, the thickness of a graph is the minimum number of planar subgraphs whose union equals to graph G.

Thus, a planar graph has thickness one. Graphs of thickness two are called biplanar graphs. The concept of thickness originates in the Earth–Moon problem on the chromatic number of biplanar graphs, posed in 1959 by Gerhard Ringel, and on a related 1962 conjecture of Frank Harary: Every graph on nine points or its complementary graph is non-planar. The problem is equivalent to determining whether the complete graph K_{9} is biplanar (it is not, and the conjecture is true). A comprehensive survey on the state of the arts of the topic as of 1998 was written by Petra Mutzel, Thomas Odenthal and Mark Scharbrodt.

== Specific graphs ==
The thickness of the complete graph on n vertices, K_{n}, is

$$\left \lfloor \frac{n+7}{6} \right\rfloor,$$

except when n = 9, 10 for which the thickness is three.

With some exceptions, the thickness of a complete bipartite graph K_{a,b} is generally:

$$\left \lceil \frac{ab}{2(a+b-2)} \right \rceil.$$

== Properties ==
Every forest is planar, and every planar graph can be partitioned into at most three forests. Therefore, the thickness of any graph G is at most equal to the arboricity of the same graph (the minimum number of forests into which it can be partitioned) and at least equal to the arboricity divided by three.

The graphs of maximum degree $d$ have thickness at most $\lceil d/2\rceil$. This cannot be improved: for a $d$-regular graph with girth at least $2d$, the high girth forces any planar subgraph to be sparse, causing its thickness to be exactly $\lceil d/2\rceil$.

Sulanke's nine-color Earth–Moon map, with adjacencies described by the join of a 6-vertex complete graph and 5-vertex cycle graph (center). Because the adjacencies in this graph are the union of those in two planar maps (left and right) it has thickness two.

Graphs of thickness $t$ with $n$ vertices have at most $t(3n-6)$ edges. Because this gives them average degree less than $6t$, their degeneracy is at most $6t-1$ and their chromatic number is at most $6t$. Here, the degeneracy can be defined as the maximum, over subgraphs of the given graph, of the minimum degree within the subgraph. In the other direction, if a graph has degeneracy $D$ then its arboricity and thickness are at most $D$. One can find an ordering of the vertices of the graph in which each vertex has at most $D$ neighbors that come later than it in the ordering, and assigning these edges to $D$ distinct subgraphs produces a partition of the graph into $D$ trees, which are planar graphs.

Even in the case $t=2$, the precise value of the chromatic number is unknown; this is Gerhard Ringel's Earth–Moon problem. An example of Thom Sulanke shows that, for $t=2$, at least 9 colors are needed.

== Related problems ==
Thickness is closely related to the problem of simultaneous embedding. If two or more planar graphs all share the same vertex set, then it is possible to embed all these graphs in the plane, with the edges drawn as curves, so that each vertex has the same position in all the different drawings. However, it may not be possible to construct such a drawing while keeping the edges drawn as straight line segments.

A different graph invariant, the rectilinear thickness or geometric thickness of a graph G, counts the smallest number of planar graphs into which G can be decomposed subject to the restriction that all of these graphs can be drawn simultaneously with straight edges. The book thickness adds an additional restriction, that all of the vertices be drawn in convex position, forming a circular layout of the graph. However, in contrast to the situation for arboricity and degeneracy, no two of these three thickness parameters are always within a constant factor of each other.

== Computational complexity ==
It is NP-hard to compute the thickness of a given graph, and NP-complete to test whether the thickness is at most two. However, the connection to arboricity allows the thickness to be approximated to within an approximation ratio of 3 in polynomial time.
