= Parity (mathematics) =

Property of being an even or odd number

Cuisenaire rods: 5 (yellow) cannot be evenly divided in 2 (red) by any 2 rods of the same color/length, while 6 (dark green) can be evenly divided in 2 by 3 (lime green).

In mathematics, parity is the property of an integer of whether it is even or odd. An integer is even if it is divisible by 2, and odd if it is not. For example, −4, 0, and 82 are even numbers, while −7, 5, and 23 are odd numbers.

The above definition of parity applies only to integer numbers. Hence it cannot be applied to numbers with fractions or decimals such as 1/2 or 7.2742. See § Higher mathematics for some extensions of the notion of parity to a larger class of "numbers" or in other more general settings.

Even and odd numbers have opposite parities, for example 22 (an even number) and 13 (an odd number). In particular, the parity of zero is even. Any two consecutive integers have opposite parity. An integer expressed in the decimal numeral system is even or odd according to whether its last digit is even or odd. That is, if the last digit is 1, 3, 5, 7, or 9, then it is odd; otherwise it is even—as the last digit of any even number is 0, 2, 4, 6, or 8.

This concept applies to any even base system: any integer expressed in the binary numeral system is odd if its last digit is 1; and it is even if its last digit is 0. In an odd base, the number is even if and only if the sum of its digits is even; for example, in base seven, 11 (equivalent to 8 in base ten) is even (because $\Sigma = 2$) and 124 (equivalent to 67 in base ten) is odd (because $\Sigma = 7$).

== Definition ==
An even number is an integer of the form
$$x = 2k$$
where k is an integer; an odd number is an integer of the form
$$x = 2k +1.$$

An equivalent definition is that an even number is divisible by 2:
$$2 \ | \ x$$
and an odd number is not:
$$2\not| \ x$$

The sets of even and odd numbers can be defined as following:
$$\{ 2k: k \in \mathbb{Z} \}$$
$$\{ 2k+1: k \in \mathbb{Z} \}$$

The set of even numbers is a prime ideal of $\mathbb{Z}$ and the quotient ring $\mathbb{Z}/2\mathbb{Z}$ is the field with two elements. Parity can then be defined as the unique ring homomorphism from $\mathbb{Z}$ to $\mathbb{Z}/2\mathbb{Z}$ where odd numbers are 1 and even numbers are 0. The consequences of this homomorphism are covered below.

== Properties ==
The following laws can be verified using the properties of divisibility. They are a special case of rules in modular arithmetic, and are commonly used to check if an equality is likely to be correct by testing the parity of each side. As with ordinary arithmetic, multiplication and addition are commutative and associative in modulo 2 arithmetic, and multiplication is distributive over addition. However, subtraction in modulo 2 is identical to addition, so subtraction also possesses these properties, which is not true for normal integer arithmetic.

=== Addition and subtraction ===
- even ± even = even;
- even ± odd = odd;
- odd ± odd = even;

=== Multiplication ===
- even × even = even;
- even × odd = even;
- odd × odd = odd.

By construction in the previous section, the structure ({even, odd}, +, ×) is in fact the field with two elements.

=== Division ===
The division of two whole numbers does not necessarily result in a whole number. For example, 1 divided by 4 equals 1/4, which is neither even nor odd, since the concepts of even and odd apply only to integers. But when the quotient is an integer, it will be even if and only if the dividend has more factors of two than the divisor.

== History ==
The ancient Greeks considered 1, the monad, to be neither fully odd nor fully even. Some of this sentiment survived into the 19th century: Friedrich Wilhelm August Fröbel's 1826 The Education of Man instructs the teacher to drill students with the claim that 1 is neither even nor odd, to which Fröbel attaches the philosophical afterthought,

It is well to direct the pupil's attention here at once to a great far-reaching law of nature and of thought. It is this, that between two relatively different things or ideas there stands always a third, in a sort of balance, seeming to unite the two. Thus, there is here between odd and even numbers one number (one) which is neither of the two. Similarly, in form, the right angle stands between the acute and obtuse angles; and in language, the semi-vowels or aspirants between the mutes and vowels. A thoughtful teacher and a pupil taught to think for himself can scarcely help noticing this and other important laws.

== Higher mathematics ==
=== Higher dimensions and more general classes of numbers ===
Position: c8 black cross, e8 black cross, b7 black cross, f7 black cross, d6 black knight, b5 black cross, f5 black cross, c4 black cross, e4 black cross, c1 white bishop, f1 white bishop

Each of the white bishops is confined to squares of the same parity; the black knight can only jump to squares of alternating parity.

Integer coordinates of points in Euclidean spaces of two or more dimensions also have a parity, usually defined as the parity of the sum of the coordinates. For instance, the face-centered cubic lattice and its higher-dimensional generalizations (the D_{n} lattices) consist of all of the integer points whose coordinates have an even sum. This feature also manifests itself in chess, where the parity of a square is indicated by its color: bishops are constrained to moving between squares of the same parity, whereas knights alternate parity between moves. This form of parity was famously used to solve the mutilated chessboard problem: if two opposite corner squares are removed from a chessboard, then the remaining board cannot be covered by dominoes, because each domino covers one square of each parity and there are two more squares of one parity than of the other.

The parity of an ordinal number may be defined to be even if the number is a limit ordinal, or a limit ordinal plus a finite even number, and odd otherwise.

Let R be a commutative ring and let I be an ideal of R whose index is 2. Elements of the coset $0+I$ may be called even, while elements of the coset $1+I$ may be called odd. As an example, let R = Z_{(2)} be the localization of Z at the prime ideal (2). Then an element of R is even or odd if and only if its numerator is so in Z.

=== Number theory ===
The even numbers form an ideal in the ring of integers, but the odd numbers do not—this is clear from the fact that the identity element for addition, zero, is an element of the even numbers only. An integer is even if it is congruent to 0 modulo this ideal, in other words if it is congruent to 0 modulo 2, and odd if it is congruent to 1 modulo 2.

All prime numbers are odd, with one exception: the prime number 2. All known perfect numbers are even; it is unknown whether any odd perfect numbers exist.

Goldbach's conjecture states that every even integer greater than 2 can be represented as a sum of two prime numbers. Modern computer calculations have shown this conjecture to be true for integers up to at least 4 × 10^{18}, but still no general proof has been found.

=== Group theory ===
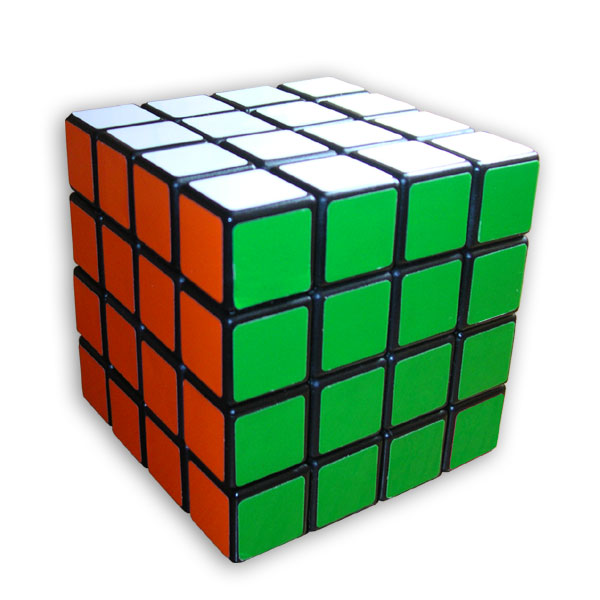
Rubik's Revenge in solved state

The parity of a permutation (as defined in abstract algebra) is the parity of the number of transpositions into which the permutation can be decomposed. For example (ABC) to (BCA) is even because it can be done by swapping A and B then C and A (two transpositions). It can be shown that no permutation can be decomposed both in an even and in an odd number of transpositions. Hence the above is a suitable definition. In Rubik's Cube, Megaminx, and other twisting puzzles, the moves of the puzzle allow only even permutations of the puzzle pieces, so parity is important in understanding the configuration space of these puzzles.

The Feit–Thompson theorem states that a finite group is always solvable if its order is an odd number. This is an example of odd numbers playing a role in an advanced mathematical theorem where the method of application of the simple hypothesis of "odd order" is far from obvious.

=== Analysis ===
The parity of a function describes how its values change when its arguments are exchanged with their negations. An even function, such as an even power of a variable, gives the same result for any argument as for its negation. An odd function, such as an odd power of a variable, gives for any argument the negation of its result when given the negation of that argument. It is possible for a function to be neither odd nor even, and for the case f(x) = 0, to be both odd and even. The Taylor series of an even function contains only terms whose exponent is an even number, and the Taylor series of an odd function contains only terms whose exponent is an odd number.

=== Combinatorial game theory ===
In combinatorial game theory, an evil number is a number that has an even number of 1's in its binary representation, and an odious number is a number that has an odd number of 1's in its binary representation; these numbers play an important role in the strategy for the game Kayles. The parity function maps a number to the number of 1's in its binary representation, modulo 2, so its value is zero for evil numbers and one for odious numbers. The Thue–Morse sequence, an infinite sequence of 0's and 1's, has a 0 in position i when i is evil, and a 1 in that position when i is odious.

== Additional applications ==
In information theory, a parity bit appended to a binary number provides the simplest form of error detecting code. If a single bit in the resulting value is changed, then it will no longer have the correct parity: changing a bit in the original number gives it a different parity than the recorded one, and changing the parity bit while not changing the number it was derived from again produces an incorrect result. In this way, all single-bit transmission errors may be reliably detected. Some more sophisticated error detecting codes are also based on the use of multiple parity bits for subsets of the bits of the original encoded value.

In wind instruments with a cylindrical bore and in effect closed at one end, such as the clarinet at the mouthpiece, the harmonics produced are odd multiples of the fundamental frequency. (With cylindrical pipes open at both ends, used for example in some organ stops such as the open diapason, the harmonics are even multiples of the same frequency for the given bore length, but this has the effect of the fundamental frequency being doubled and all multiples of this fundamental frequency being produced.) See harmonic series (music).

In some countries, house numberings are chosen so that the houses on one side of a street have even numbers and the houses on the other side have odd numbers. Similarly, among United States numbered highways, even numbers primarily indicate east–west highways while odd numbers primarily indicate north–south highways. Among airline flight numbers, even numbers typically identify eastbound or northbound flights, and odd numbers typically identify westbound or southbound flights.

== See also ==
- Divisor
- Half-integer
