= AD+ =

Set theory axiom extension

In set theory, AD^{+} is an extension, proposed by W. Hugh Woodin, to the axiom of determinacy. The axiom, which is to be understood in the context of ZF plus DC_{R} (the axiom of dependent choice for real numbers), states two things:

1. Every set of real numbers is ∞-Borel.
2. For any ordinal λ < Θ, any A ⊆ ω^{ω}, and any continuous function π: λ^{ω} → ω^{ω}, the preimage π^{−1}[A] is determined. (Here, λ^{ω} is to be given the product topology, starting with the discrete topology on λ.)

The second clause by itself is referred to as ordinal determinacy.

== See also ==
- Axiom of projective determinacy
- Axiom of real determinacy
- Suslin's problem
- Topological game
