= E. T. Parker =

American mathematician

- Born: 1926
- Died: 1991
- Education: Ohio State University
- Known for: Euler's conjecture
- Scientific career
- Fields: Combinatorics
- Workplaces: University of Illinois
- Thesis: On quadruply transitive groups (1957)
- Doctoral advisor: Marshall Hall Jr.

Ernest Tilden Parker (1926–1991) was a professor at the University of Illinois Urbana-Champaign. He is notable for his breakthrough work in 1959 along with R. C. Bose and S. S. Shrikhande in their disproof of the famous conjecture made by Leonhard Euler dated 1782 that there do not exist two mutually orthogonal latin squares of order $4n+2$ for every $n$. He was at that time employed in the UNIVAC division of Remington Rand, but he subsequently joined the mathematics faculty at University of Illinois. In 1968, he and a Ph.D. student, K. B. Reid, disproved a conjecture on tournaments by Paul Erdős and Leo Moser.

Parker received his Ph.D. for work 'On Quadruply Transitive Groups' at Ohio State University in 1957; his advisor was Marshall Hall Jr.

== Selected works ==
- Bose, R. C.; Shrikhande, S. S.; Parker, E. T. (1960), "Further results on the construction of mutually orthogonal Latin squares and the falsity of Euler's conjecture", Canadian Journal of Mathematics, 12: 189–203, doi:10.4153/CJM-1960-016-5, MR 0122729.
- Reid, K. B.; Parker, E. T. (1970), "Disproof of a conjecture of Erdős and Moser on tournaments", Journal of Combinatorial Theory, 9 (3): 225–238, doi:10.1016/S0021-9800(70)80061-8, MR 0274328.
