= 36 Cube =

3D puzzle

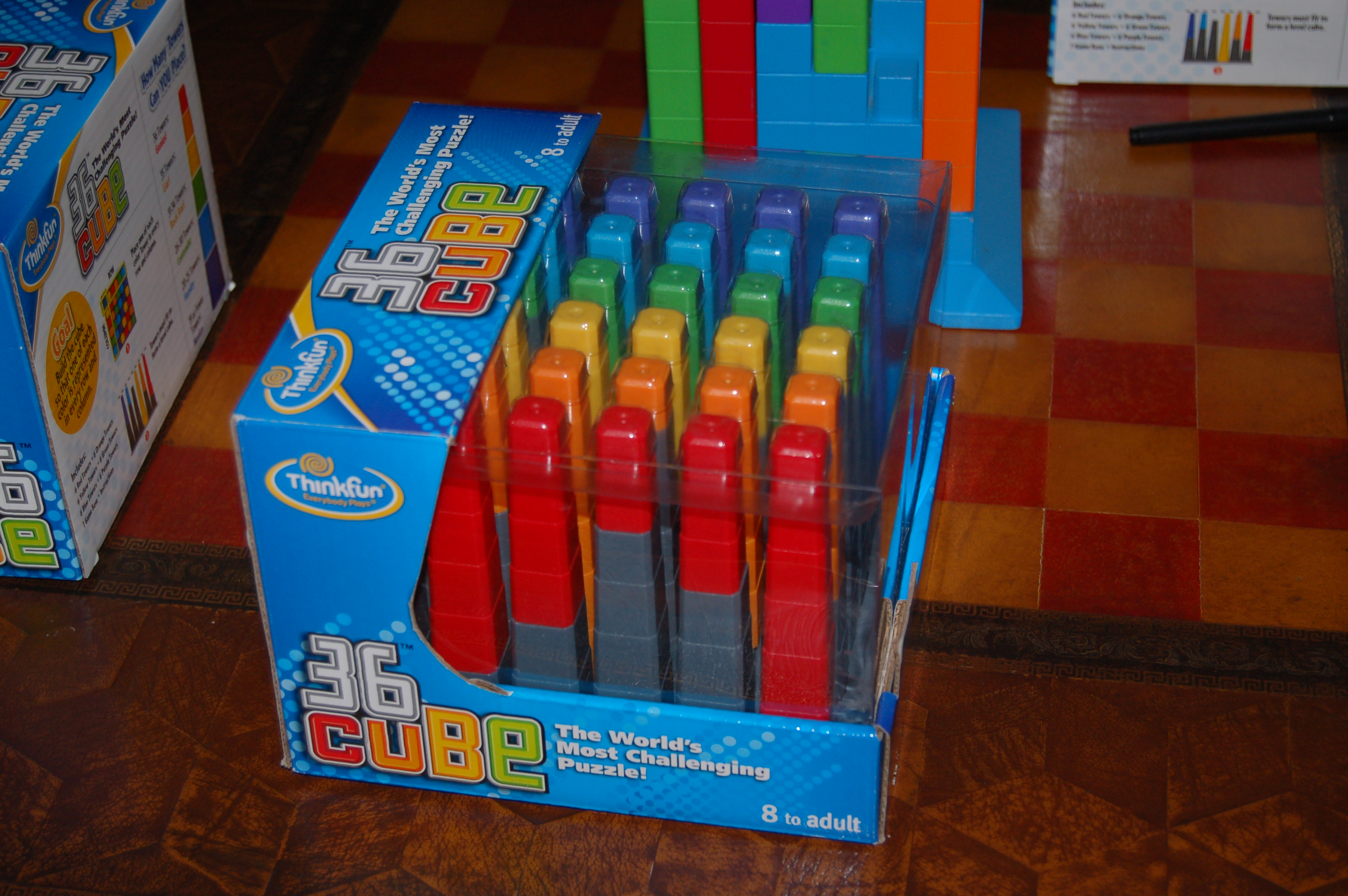
36 Cube puzzle in box

The 36 Cube is a three-dimensional sudoku puzzle created by ThinkFun. The puzzle consists of a gray base that resembles a city skyline, plus 36 colored towers. The towers come in six different colors and six different heights. The goal of the puzzle is to place all the towers onto the base so as to form a level cube with each of the six colors appearing once, and only once, in each row and column. The 36 cube was invented by Dr. Derrick Niederman, a PhD. at MIT. He came up with the idea while writing a book on whole numbers, after unearthing an 18th-century mathematical hypothesis. This supposition, the 36 officer problem, requires placing six regiments of six differently ranked officers in a 6-x-6 square without having any rank or regiment in the same column. Such an arrangement would form a Graeco-Latin square. Euler conjectured there was no solution to this problem. Although Euler was correct, his conjecture was not settled until Gaston Tarry came up with an exhaustive proof in 1901.

Euler's 36 officer problem is a mental challenge, which can be attempted either in one's head or on paper, whereas the 36 cube is a mechanical puzzle that must be played on a manufactured grid. Therefore, it requires some abstract thinking, and a certain amount of special insight.

The 36 Cube is, however, subtly different from the 36 officer problem. Careful inspection of the pieces reveals that two of the pieces are special. These two pieces will fit on certain parts of the base differently from other pieces of the same height. With this subtle modification, there are in fact 96 possible solutions to the 36 Cube puzzle.

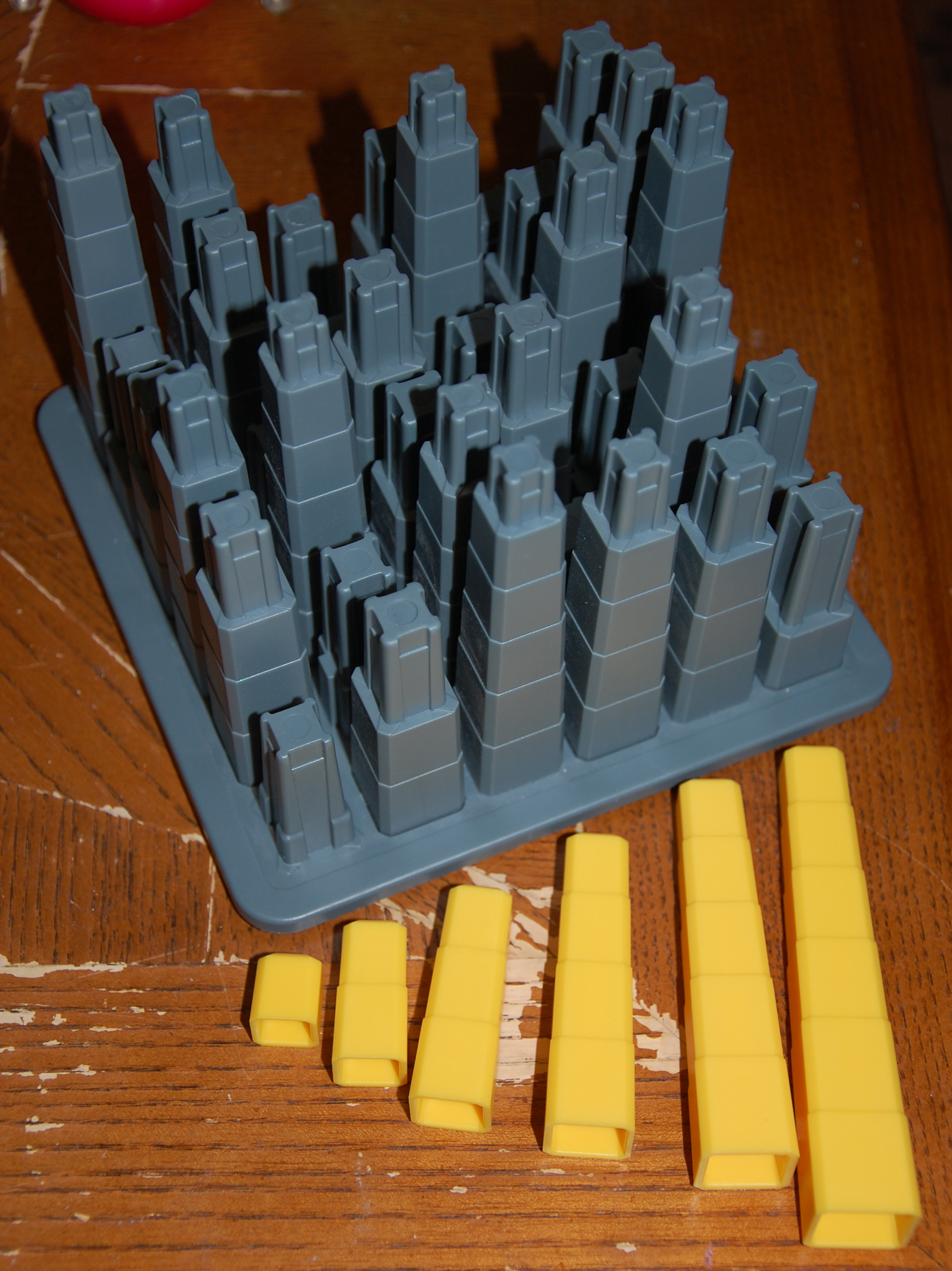
Closer view

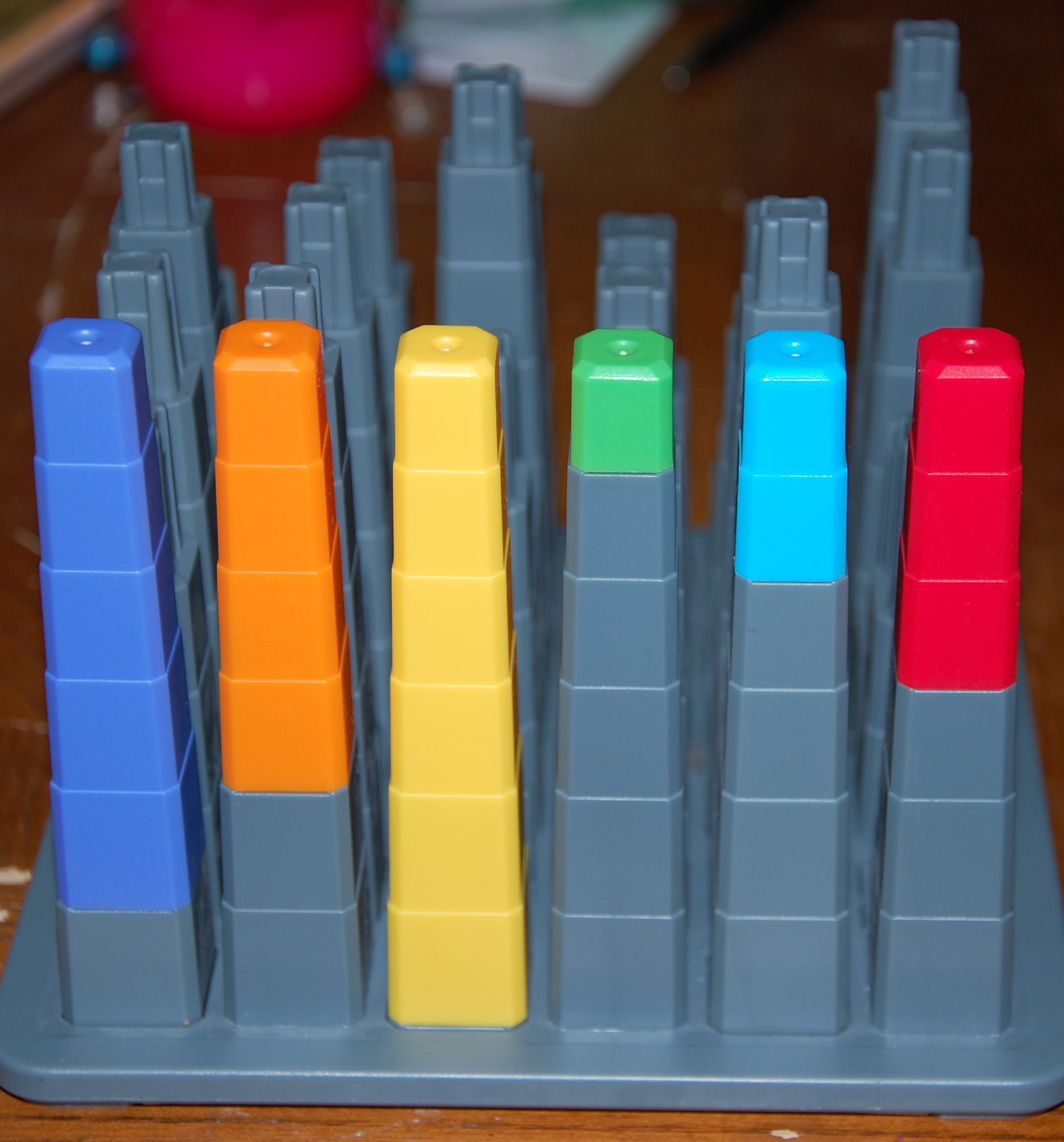
One row of a trial solution

A possible solution: the two special pieces are outlined (having two pieces of the same height on a row violates the 36 officers problem)

== Awards ==
- 36 Cube - ASTRA Best Toy for Kids List - 2009
- 36 Cube - Parents' Choice Gold Award - 2009
- iParenting Media Awards Best Products of 2009
