= Stan Wagon =

Canadian-American mathematician

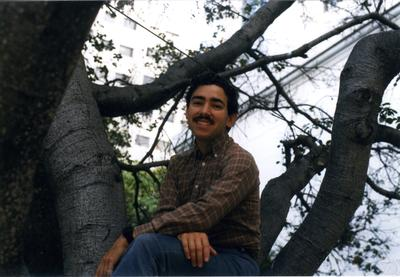
Stanley Wagon

Stanley Wagon is a Canadian-American mathematician, a professor emeritus of mathematics at Macalester College in Minnesota. He is the author of multiple books on number theory, geometry, and computational mathematics, and is also known for his snow sculpture.

== Biography ==
Wagon was born in Montreal, to Sam and Diana (Idlovitch) Wagon. His sister Lila (Wagon) Hope-Simpson died in 2021. Wagon did his undergraduate studies at McGill University in Montreal, graduating in 1971. He earned his Ph.D. in 1975 from Dartmouth College, under the supervision of James Earl Baumgartner. He married mathematician Joan Hutchinson, and the two of them shared a single faculty position at Smith College and again at Macalester, where they moved in 1990.

== Books ==
- The Banach–Tarski Paradox (Cambridge University Press, 1985)
- Old and New Unsolved Problems in Plane Geometry and Number Theory (with Victor Klee, Mathematical Association of America, 1991)
- Mathematica® in Action: Problem Solving Through Visualization and Computation (W.H. Freeman, 1991; 2nd ed., Springer, 1999; 3rd ed., Springer, 2010)
- Animating Calculus (with E. Packel, TELOS, 1996)
- Which Way Did the Bicycle Go? (with J. D. E. Konhauser and D. Velleman, Mathematical Association of America, 1996)
- VisualDSolve: Visualizing Differential Equations with Mathematica (with Dan Schwalbe, TELOS, 1997; 2nd ed., with Schwalbe and Antonin Slavik, Wolfram Research, 2009).
- A Course in Computational Number Theory (with David Bressoud, Springer, 2000)
- The Mathematical Explorer (Wolfram Research, Inc., 2001)
- The SIAM 100-Digit Challenge: A Study in High-Accuracy Numerical Computing (with Laurie, Bornemann, and Waldvogel, SIAM, 2004)

== Other activities ==
Wagon is also known for riding a bicycle with square wheels, for his mathematical snow sculptures, and for having given the name to the 420 Arch, a natural stone arch in southern Utah.

== Awards and honors ==
Wagon won the Lester R. Ford Award of the Mathematical Association of America for his 1988 paper, "Fourteen Proofs of a Result about Tiling a Rectangle". Wagon and his co-authors Ellen Gethner and Brian Wick won the Chauvenet Prize for mathematical exposition in 2002 for their 1998 paper, "A Stroll through the Gaussian Primes". Wagon and Andrew Beveridge received the 2015 Carl B. Allendoerfer Prize for their paper ″The Sorting Hat Goes to College″.
