= Even and odd ordinals =

In mathematics, even and odd ordinals extend the concept of parity from the natural numbers to the ordinal numbers. They are useful in some transfinite induction proofs.

The literature contains a few equivalent definitions of the parity of an ordinal α:

- Zero and each limit ordinal are even. The successor of an even ordinal is odd, and vice versa.
- Let α = λ + n, where λ is a limit ordinal and n is a natural number. The parity of α is the parity of n.
- Let n be the finite term of the Cantor normal form of α. The parity of α is the parity of n.
- Let α = ωβ + n, where n is a natural number. The parity of α is the parity of n.
- If α = 2β, then α is even. Otherwise α = 2β + 1 and α is odd.

Unlike the case of even integers, one cannot go on to characterize even ordinals as ordinal numbers of the form β2 = β + β. Ordinal multiplication is not commutative, so in general 2β ≠ β2. In fact, the even ordinal ω + 4 cannot be expressed as β + β, and the ordinal number

(ω + 3)2 = (ω + 3) + (ω + 3) = ω + (3 + ω) + 3 = ω + ω + 3 = ω2 + 3

is not even.

A simple application of ordinal parity is the idempotence law for cardinal addition (given the well-ordering theorem). Given an infinite cardinal κ, or generally any limit ordinal κ, κ is order-isomorphic to both its subset of even ordinals and its subset of odd ordinals. Hence one has the cardinal sum κ + κ = κ.
