= L. W. Beineke =

American mathematician

Lowell Wayne Beineke (born 1939) is a professor of graph theory at Purdue University Fort Wayne. He is known for his elegant characterization of line graphs (derived graph) in terms of the forbidden graph characterization.

Beineke has taught mathematics at Purdue University Fort Wayne since 1965. He received a B.S. from Purdue University in 1961, an M.S. from the University of Michigan in 1962, and a Ph.D. in 1965. His Ph.D. advisor was Frank Harary.

Beineke holds the Jack W. Schrey chair of mathematical sciences. He was the recipient of the Amoco Foundation Outstanding Teaching Award in 1978, and again in 1992.

== Books ==
- Selected topics in graph theory, LW Beineke, R. J. Wilson, 1978, Academic Press, New York

== Research work ==
- Topological graph theory, AT White, LW Beineke, Selected Topics in Graph Theory, 1978
- "The thickness of the complete graph", LW Beineke, Frank Harary – Canadian Journal of Mathematics, 1965, books.google.com
- Tournaments, K. B. Reid, L. W. Beineke - Selected topics in graph theory, 1978
- "Characterizations of derived graphs", LW Beineke – J. Combin. Theory Ser. B, 1970
