= Ellen Gethner =

American mathematician and computer scientist (born 1960)

- Born: 1960 (age 64–65); United States
- Occupation(s): Mathematician and Computer Scientist
- Known for: Research in graph theory, winning the Mathematical Association of America's Chauvenet Prize in 2002

Ellen Gethner is a US mathematician and computer scientist specializing in graph theory who won the Mathematical Association of America's Chauvenet Prize in 2002 with co-authors Stan Wagon and Brian Wick for their paper A stroll through the Gaussian Primes.

== Career ==
Gethner has two doctorates. She completed her first, a PhD in mathematics from Ohio State University, in 1992; her dissertation, Rational Period Functions For The Modular Group And Related Discrete Groups, was supervised by L. Alayne Parson. She completed a second PhD in computer science from the University of British Columbia in 2002, with a dissertation Computational Aspects of Escher Tilings supervised by Nick Pippenger and David G. Kirkpatrick. Gethner is an associate professor in the Department of Computer Science and Engineering at University of Colorado Denver.

== Research ==
Gethner became interested in connections between geometry and art after a high school lesson using a kaleidoscope to turn a drawing into an Escher-like tessellation of the plane. This later inspired some of her research on wallpaper patterns and on converting music into visual patterns.
