= Gerhard Ringel =

German-American mathematician

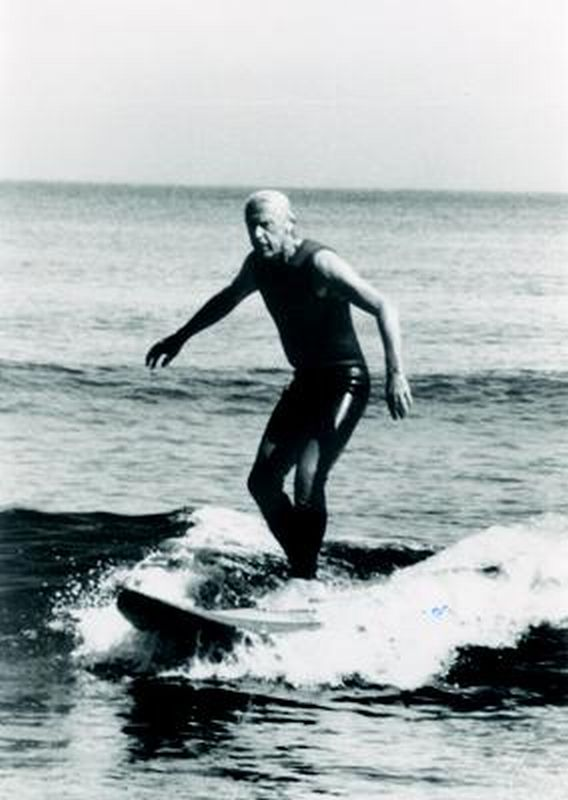
Gerhard Ringel

Gerhard Ringel (October 28, 1919 in Kollnbrunn, Austria – June 24, 2008 in Santa Cruz, California) was a German mathematician. He was one of the pioneers in graph theory and contributed significantly to the proof of the Heawood conjecture (now the Ringel–Youngs theorem), a mathematical problem closely linked with the four color theorem.

Although born in Austria, Ringel was raised in Czechoslovakia and attended Charles University before being drafted into the Wehrmacht in 1940 (after Germany had taken control of much of what had been Czechoslovakia). After the war Ringel served for over four years in a Soviet prisoner of war camp.

He earned his PhD from the University of Bonn in 1951 with a thesis written under the supervision of Emanuel Sperner and Ernst Peschl. Ringel started his academic career as professor at the Free University Berlin. In 1970 he left Germany due to bureaucratic consequences of the German student movement, and continued his career at the University of California, Santa Cruz, having been invited there by his coauthor, John W. T. (Ted) Youngs. He was awarded honorary doctorate degrees from the Karlsruhe Institute of Technology and the Free University of Berlin.

Besides his mathematical skills he was a widely acknowledged entomologist. His main emphasis lay on collecting and breeding butterflies. Prior to his death, he gave his outstanding collection of butterflies to the UCSC Museum of Natural History Collections.

== Publications ==
- Ringel, Gerhard; Youngs, J.W.T. (1968). "Solution of the Heawood map-coloring problem". Proceedings of the National Academy of Sciences of the United States of America. 60 (2): 438–445. Bibcode:1968PNAS...60..438R. doi:10.1073/pnas.60.2.438. MR 0228378. PMC 225066. PMID 16591648.
- Ringel, Gerhard (1974). Map color theorem. Berlin: Springer. ISBN 978-3-642-65759-7. OCLC 679997454.
- Hartsfield, Nora; Ringel, Gerhard (1990). Pearls in Graph Theory. Boston, MA: Academic Press. ISBN 0-12-328552-6.
