= Piston rod =

Link connecting the piston to the crank in a reciprocating piston mechanism

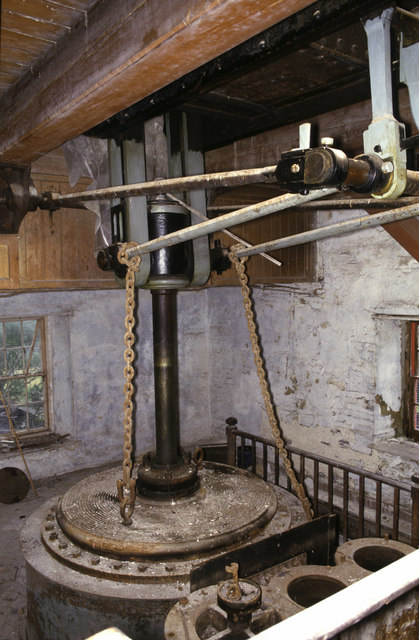
The vertical piston rod of a large beam engine at Dorothea Quarry

In a piston engine, a piston rod joins a piston to the crosshead and thus to the connecting rod that drives the crankshaft or (for steam locomotives) the driving wheels.

Internal combustion engines, and in particular all current automobile engines, do not generally have piston rods. Instead they use trunk pistons, where the piston and crosshead are combined and so do not need a rod between them. The term piston rod has been used as a synonym for 'connecting rod' in the context of these engines.

Engines with crossheads have piston rods. These include most steam locomotives and some large marine diesel engines.

Compressor piston rods are made from various types of steel depending on the stress levels and gas compression.

== Steam engines ==
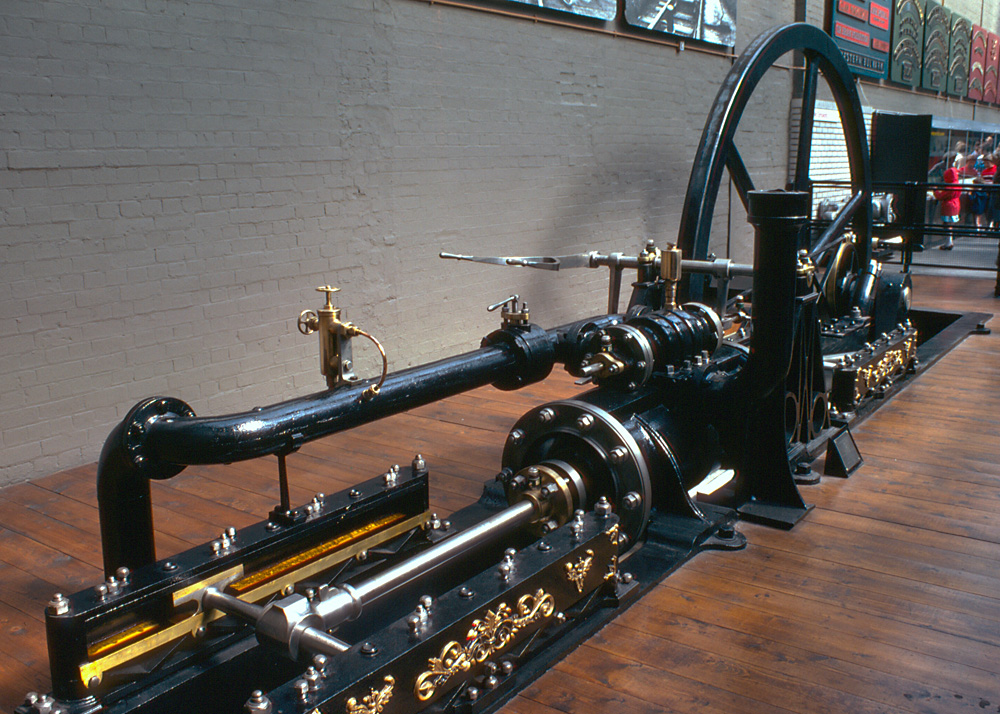
Stationary steam engine from Swannington Incline. Note the tail rod and secondary crosshead

The first single-acting beam engines, such as Newcomen's, had a single power stroke acting downwards. Rather than a piston rod, they used an iron chain. This could transmit a tensile force, but not a compression force pushing upwards. The piston was sealed in the cylinder around its rim but the top of the cylinder was open. Later, a rudimentary piston rod was used, simply to eliminate the cost of a long forged chain.

Watt's development of the steam engine introduced an enclosed upper cylinder. This now required a stuffing box to seal around the piston rod, and for the piston rod to be machined smooth and accurately cylindrical. The engines were still single-acting at this time and the rod was still only acting in tension.

Later developments, also by Watt, produced a double-acting cylinder. The piston rod now had to transmit a force alternately pushing and pulling. The steam engine's general use of an enclosed cylinder, nearly always double-acting, made it dependent on the stuffing box and so the piston rod.

=== Attachment ===
Piston rods are usually attached to the crosshead and the piston by a transverse slot and a tapered key or gib. Driving this key sideways tightens the attachment. Using a transverse key allows relatively easy dismantling for maintenance. Some smaller pistons are retained by a threaded piston rod and a large nut, although the crosshead nearly always uses a key.

As the precise length of the piston rod is important for timing the engine's valvegear, the attachment tightens the piston down onto a fixed step or location in the piston rod and the length (and valve timing) is not adjustable. This length requires the precision of the manufactured rod but, unlike the rod driving the valves, does not need to be adjusted even more precisely by a fitter during the engine's erection.

=== Tail rods ===
Early steam engineers were convinced that horizontal cylinders would suffer excessive wear, owing to the weight of the piston riding on the bore of the cylinder. Vertical cylinders remained a favourite for some years. When horizontal cylinders were adopted, one measure used to carry the piston weight was to have an extended or second piston rod on the other side of the piston. This emerged through a second stuffing box and in rare cases (illus.) was supported by a second crosshead.

Enclosing the entire tail rod in a sealed casing avoided the need for a stuffing box and any leakage of steam. However this also gave a risk that condensed water could accumulate in the casing, leading to hydraulic lock and mechanical damage.

=== Trunk engines ===
Trunk engines were compact steam engines, developed for the propulsion of ships. They reduced their overall length by placing the crosshead alongside the piston in the form of a hollow tubular trunk. There was thus no longer any need for a piston rod. The connecting rod and its gudgeon pin were mounted inside this trunk. Trunk engines had extremely large diameter pistons and so the old issue of supporting piston weight and avoiding cylinder wear was again a concern. Trunk engines used a second trunk as a tail rod to support their large pistons.

=== Single-acting steam engines ===
Some late steam engines, mostly high-speed steam engines, were also single acting. These also used trunk pistons, but in a new form. These engines were vertical and used a simple piston design, with no separate trunk but using the sides of an elongated piston as the crosshead bearing surface.

This trunk piston design would become almost universal for internal combustion engines.

== Steam locomotives ==
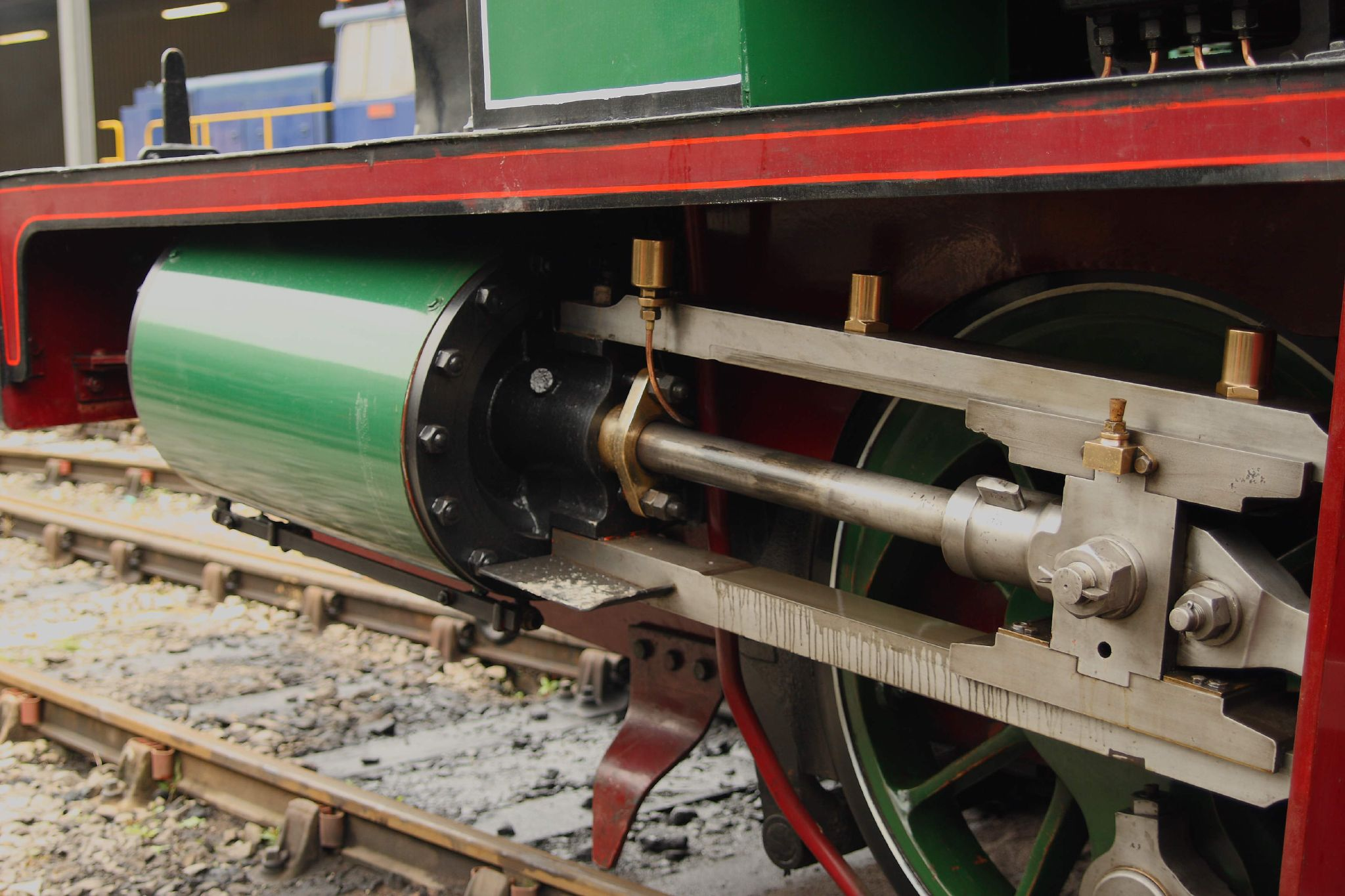
Small steam locomotive, with piston rod visible between the cylinder (green, left) and the crosshead (right). Note the small brass lubricator (the leftmost), whose function is to lubricate the piston rod and stuffing box, through a short oil pipe

Almost all steam locomotives have used a similar design of cylinder, with a crosshead slide mounted adjacent to the cylinder and a short piston rod between them.

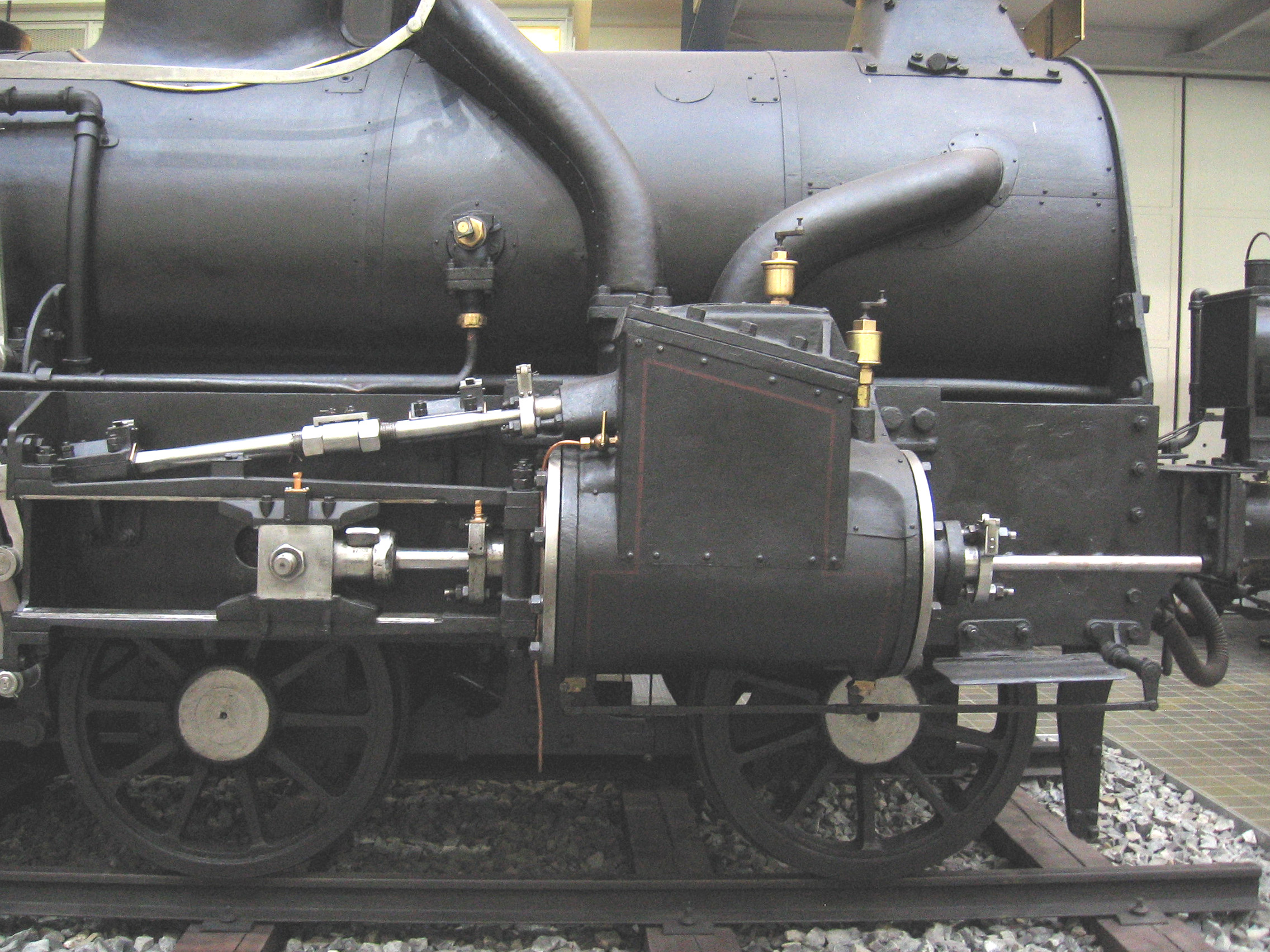
Czech class 252.0 locomotive, with a tail rod

In some cases, tail rods were also used. These were rare in the United Kingdom, but relatively common in Europe, at least for large locomotives.

== Diesel engines ==
Large diesel engines, crosshead type on the left, with piston rod (9) and trunk piston type on the right.

Internal combustion (piston) engines operate at higher speeds than steam engines. They thus benefit from reduced reciprocating mass and from a shorter, stiffer linkage between the piston and the connecting rod. Double-acting engines are also very rare, although these did use piston rods. The high-speed steam engine's lightweight trunk piston was thus soon adopted and remains in service today. Its major changes have been in its sealing rings and the adoption of aluminium alloys to make the pistons lighter.

Some large slow-speed Diesel engines, particularly those for ships, use crossheads and piston rods. Medium- and high-speed diesel engines operate at faster speeds and so use lighter-weight trunk pistons.

== See also ==
- Steam locomotive components
