= Slider-crank linkage =

Mechanism for converting rotary motion into linear motion

Slider crank mechanisms of a steam engine with a crosshead linking the piston and the crank.

Crank slider mechanisms with 0 and 1.25 eccentricity.

Coupler curves of a slider crank.

A slider-crank linkage (also commonly referred to as a crank-slider linkage) is a four-link mechanism with three revolute joints and one prismatic (sliding) joint. The naming convention of slider-crank and crank-slider is generally used to refer to the functional [input]-[output] of the linkage. In a crank-slider, the rotation of the crank drives the linear movement of the slider, and in a slider-crank, the expansion of gases against a sliding piston in a cylinder can drive the rotation of the crank.

There are two types of slider-cranks: in-line and offset.

1. In-line: An in-line slider-crank has its slider positioned so the line of travel of the hinged joint of the slider passes through the base joint of the crank. This creates a symmetric slider movement back and forth as the crank rotates.
2. Offset: If the line of travel of the hinged joint of the slider does not pass through the base pivot of the crank, the slider movement is not symmetric. It moves faster in one direction than the other. This is called a quick-return mechanism.

There are also two methods to design each type: graphical and analytical.

== In-line kinematics ==
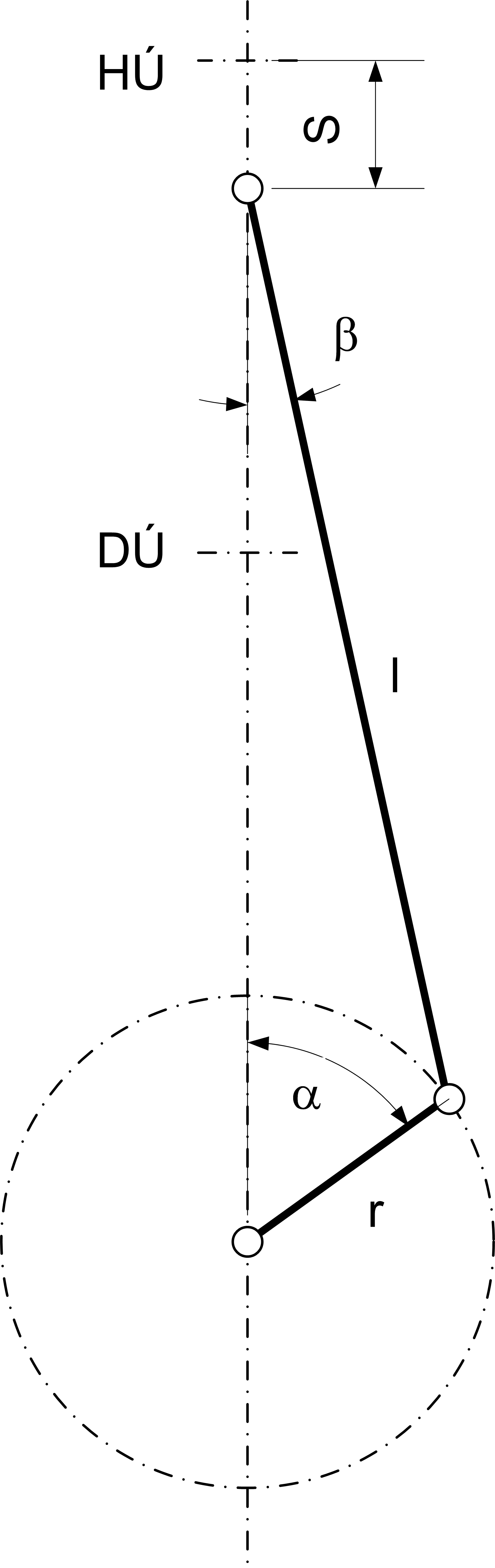

The displacement of the end of the connecting rod is approximately proportional to the cosine of the angle of rotation of the crank, when it is measured from top dead center (TDC). So the reciprocating motion created by a steadily rotating crank and connecting rod is approximately simple harmonic motion:

$$x = r \cos \alpha + l$$

where x is the distance of the end of the connecting rod from the crank axle, l is the length of the connecting rod, r is the length of the crank, and α is the angle of the crank measured from top dead center (TDC). Technically, the reciprocating motion of the connecting rod departs from sinusoidal motion due to the changing angle of the connecting rod during the cycle, the correct motion, given by the Piston motion equations is:

$$x = r \cos \alpha + \sqrt{l^2 - r^2\sin^2 \alpha}$$

As long as the connecting rod is much longer than the crank $l >> r$ the difference is negligible. This difference becomes significant in high-speed engines, which may need balance shafts to reduce the vibration due to this "secondary imbalance".

The mechanical advantage of a crank, the ratio between the force on the connecting rod and the torque on the shaft, varies throughout the crank's cycle. The relationship between the two is approximately:

$$\tau = Fr \sin (\alpha+\beta) \,$$

where $\tau\,$ is the torque and F is the force on the connecting rod. But in reality, the torque is maximum at crank angle of less than α = 90° from TDC for a given force on the piston. One way to calculate this angle is to find out when the Connecting rod smallend (piston) speed becomes the fastest in downward direction given a steady crank rotational velocity. Piston speed x' is expressed as:

$$x' = \left(-r\sin\alpha - \frac{r^2\sin\alpha \cos\alpha}{\sqrt{l^2 - r^2\sin^2\alpha}}\right)\frac{d\alpha}{dt}$$

For example, for rod length 6" and crank radius 2", numerically solving the above equation finds the velocity minima (maximum downward speed) to be at crank angle of 73.17530° after TDC. Then, using the triangle sine law, it is found that the crank to connecting rod angle is 88.21832° and the connecting rod angle is 18.60639° from vertical (see Piston motion equations#Example).

When the crank is driven by the connecting rod, a problem arises when the crank is at top dead centre (0°) or bottom dead centre (180°). At these points in the crank's cycle, a force on the connecting rod causes no torque on the crank. Therefore, if the crank is stationary and happens to be at one of these two points, it cannot be started moving by the connecting rod. For this reason, in steam locomotives, whose wheels are driven by cranks, the connecting rods are attached to the wheels at points separated by some angle, so that regardless of the position of the wheels when the engine starts, at least one connecting rod will be able to exert torque to start the train.

=== Design ===
An in-line crank slider is oriented in a way in which the pivot point of the crank is coincident with the axis of the linear movement. The follower arm, which is the link that connects the crank arm to the slider, connects to a pin in the center of sliding object. This pin is considered to be on the linear movement axis. Therefore, to be considered an in-line crank slider, the pivot point of the crank arm must be in-line with this pin point. The stroke((ΔR_{4})_{max}) of an in-line crank slider is defined as the maximum linear distance the slider may travel between the two extreme points of its motion. With an in-line crank slider, the motion of the crank and follower links is symmetric about the sliding axis. This means that the crank angle required to execute a forward stroke is equivalent to the angle required to perform a reverse stroke. For this reason, the in-line slider-crank mechanism produces balanced motion. This balanced motion implies other ideas as well. Assuming the crank arm is driven at a constant velocity, the time it takes to perform a forward stroke is equal to the time it takes to act a reverse stroke. The crank moves in only one direction, provided the position and condition of the slider are not externally altered.

=== Graphical approach ===
The graphical method of designing an in-line slider-crank mechanism involves the usage of hand-drawn or computerized diagrams. These diagrams are drawn to scale in order for easy evaluation and successful design. Basic trigonometry, the practice of analyzing the relationship between triangle features in order to determine any unknown values, can be used with a graphical compass and protractor alongside these diagrams to determine the required stroke or link lengths.

When the stroke of a mechanism needs to be calculated, first identify the ground level for the specified slider-crank mechanism. This ground level is the axis on which both the crank arm pivot-point and the slider pin are positioned. Draw the crank arm pivot point anywhere on this ground level. Once the pin positions are correctly placed, set a graphical compass to the given link length of the crank arm. Positioning the compass point on the pivot point of the crank arm, rotate the compass to produce a circle with radius equal to the length of the crank arm. This newly drawn circle represents the potential motion of the crank arm. Next, draw two models of the mechanism. These models will be oriented in a way that displays both the extreme positions of the slider. Once both diagrams are drawn, the linear distance between the retracted slider and the extended slider can be easily measured to determine the slider-crank stroke.

The retracted position of the slider is determined by further graphical evaluation. Now that the crank path is found, draw the crank slider arm in the position that places it as far away as possible from the slider. Once drawn, the crank arm should be coincident with the ground level axis that was initially drawn. Next, from the free point on the crank arm, draw the follower link using its measured or given length. Draw this length coincident with the ground level axis but in the direction toward the slider. The unhinged end of the follower will now be at the fully retracted position of the slider. Next, the extended position of the slider needs to be determined. From the pivot point of the crank arm, draw a new crank arm coincident with the ground level axis but in a position closest to the slider. This position should put the new crank arm at an angle of 180 degrees away from the retracted crank arm. Then draw the follower link with its given length in the same manner as previously mentioned. The unhinged point of the new follower will now be at the fully extended position of the slider.

Both the retracted and extended positions of the slider should now be known. Using a measuring ruler, measure the distance between these two points. This distance will be the mechanism stroke, (ΔR_{4})_{max}.

=== Analytical approach ===
To analytically design an in-line slider crank and achieve the desired stroke, the appropriate lengths of the two links, the crank and follower, need to be determined. For this case, the crank arm will be referred to as L_{2}, and the follower link will be referred to as L_{3}. With all in-line slider-crank mechanisms, the stroke is twice the length of the crank arm. Therefore, given the stroke, the length of the crank arm can be determined. This relationship is represented as:

L_{2} = (ΔR_{4})_{max} ÷ 2

Once L_{2} is found, the follower length (L_{3}) can be determined. However, because the stroke of the mechanism only depends on the crank arm length, the follower length is somewhat insignificant. As a general rule, the length of the follower link should be at least 3 times the length of the crank arm. This is to account for an often undesired increased acceleration yield, or output, of the connecting arm.

== Offset design ==
The position of an offset slider-crank is derived by a similar formula to that for the inline form; using the same letters as in the previous diagram and an offset of $o$:

$$x = r \cos \alpha + \sqrt{l^2 - (r\sin( \alpha) - o)^2}$$

Its speed (the first derivative of its position) is representable as:

$$\frac{ - r \cos( \alpha) (r \sin( \alpha) + o)}{ \sqrt{l^2 - (r \sin ( \alpha ) + o ) ^2}} - r \sin ( \alpha )$$

Its acceleration (the second derivative of its position) is representable as the complicated equation of:

$$\dfrac{r\sin\left({\alpha}\right)\left(r\sin\left({\alpha}\right)+o\right)-r^2\cos^2\left({\alpha}\right)}{\sqrt{l^2-\left(r\sin\left({\alpha}\right)+o\right)^2}}-\dfrac{r^2\cos^2\left({\alpha}\right)\left(r\sin\left({\alpha}\right)+o\right)^2}{\left(l^2-\left(r\sin\left({\alpha}\right)+o\right)^2\right)^\frac{3}{2}}-r\cos\left({\alpha}\right)$$

=== Analytical approach ===
The analytical method for designing an offset crank slider mechanism is the process by which triangular geometry is evaluated in order to determine generalized relationships among certain lengths, distances, and angles. These generalized relationships are displayed in the form of 3 equations and can be used to determine unknown values for almost any offset slider-crank. These equations express the link lengths, L_{1}, L_{2}, and L_{3}, as a function of the stroke,(ΔR_{4})_{max}, the imbalance angle, β, and the angle of an arbitrary line M, θ_{M}. Arbitrary line M is a designer-unique line that runs through the crank pivot point and the extreme retracted slider position. The 3 equations are as follows:

L_{1} = (ΔR_{4})_{max} × [(sin(θ_{M})sin(θ_{M} - β)) / sin(β)]
L_{2} = (ΔR_{4})_{max} × [(sin(θ_{M}) - sin(θ_{M} - β)) / 2sin(β)]
L_{3} = (ΔR_{4})_{max} × [(sin(θ_{M}) + sin(θ_{M} - β)) / 2sin(β)]

With these relationships, the 3 link lengths can be calculated and any related unknown values can be determined.

== Inversions ==
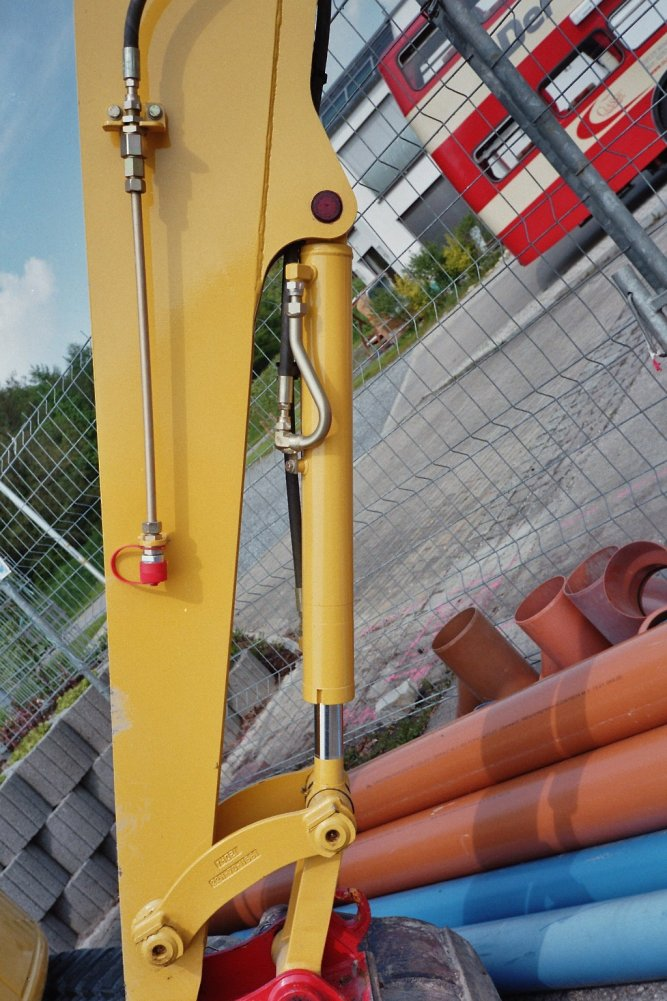
Close-up of the linear actuator of a back hoe that forms an inverted slider-crank.

Slider-crank chain inversion arises when the connecting rod, or coupler, of a slider-crank linkage becomes the ground link, so the slider is connected directly to the crank. This inverted slider-crank is the form of a slider-crank linkage that is often used to actuate a hinged joint in construction equipment like a crane or backhoe, as well as to open and close a swinging gate or door.

A slider-crank is a four-bar linkage that has a crank that rotates coupled to a slider that the moves along a straight line. This mechanism is composed of three important parts: The crank which is the rotating disc, the slider which slides inside the tube and the connecting rod which joins the parts together. As the slider moves to the right the connecting rod pushes the wheel round for the first 180 degrees of wheel rotation. When the slider begins to move back into the tube, the connecting rod pulls the wheel round to complete the rotation.

Different mechanism by fixing different link of slider crank chain are as follows:

First inversion
Obtained when link 1 (ground body) is fixed. Applications: Reciprocating engine, reciprocating compressor, etc.
Second inversion
Obtained when link 2 (crank) is fixed. Applications: Whitworth quick return mechanism, rotary engine, etc.
Third inversion
Obtained when link 3 (connecting rod) is fixed. Applications: Slotted crank mechanism, oscillatory engine, etc.
Fourth inversion
Obtained when link 4 (slider) is fixed. Applications: Hand pump, pendulum pump or Bull engine, etc.

== Gallery ==

Rocker-slider function generator of the function Log(u) for 1 < u < 10.

Slider-rocker function generator of the function Tan(u) for 0 < u < 45°.

Inverted slider crank mechanism.

Spatial slider-crank mechanism

== See also ==
- Hierapolis sawmill
- Crank (mechanism)
- Kinematic diagram
- Four-bar linkage
- Hand pump
- Piston motion equations
- Reciprocating engine
- Oscillating cylinder steam engine
- Scotch yoke
- Crosshead
