= Gudgeon =

Socket used as part of a pivot or hinge

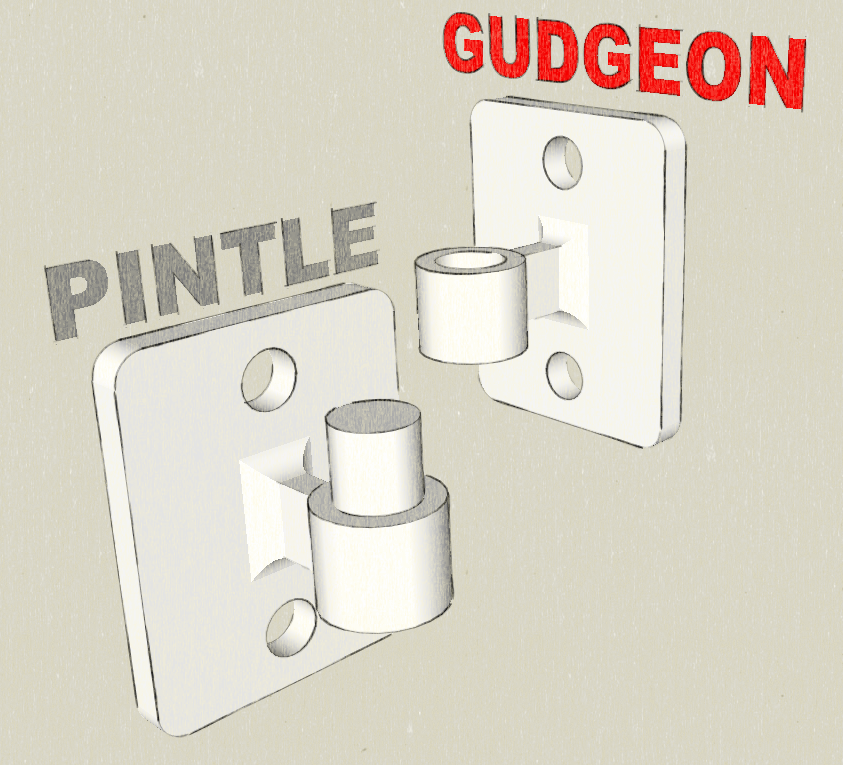
Gudgeon with a pintle

A gudgeon is a socket-like, cylindrical (i.e., female) fitting attached to one component to enable a pivoting or hinging connection to a second component. The second component carries a pintle fitting, the male counterpart to the gudgeon, enabling an interpivoting connection that can be easily separated. Designs that may use gudgeon and pintle connections include hinges, shutters and boat rudders.

The word gudgeon derives from the Middle English gojoun, from the Middle French goujon, which had the opposite meaning of a dowel or pin. Its first known use was in the 15th century.

== Types of gudgeons ==
=== Winged gudgeons ===
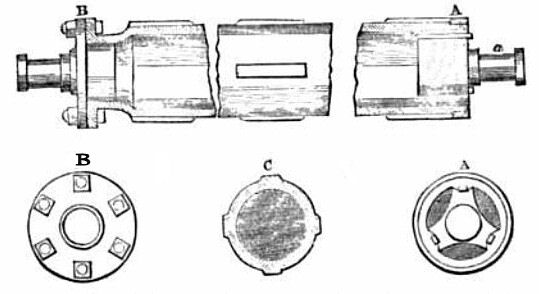
Gudgeons on the end of a shaft, A & B.

A winged gudgeon is one that has extensions that increase its ability to adhere to the fixed surface. At the beginning of the Industrial Revolution, winged gudgeons were used to support water wheel shafts, and later, steam engine shafts.

=== Gudgeon pin ===
This is a crucial component of piston engines. The British refer to a gudgeon pin which joins the small end of a connecting rod to a piston or crosshead. In American English this can be referred to as a wrist pin.

== Usage ==
=== Buildings ===
In buildings pintles and gudgeons are used for working shutters. Shutters were traditionally used to protect the glazing as well as help keep heat in the building at night during the colder months. Shutters are experiencing a comeback as protection from wind-borne storm debris. Architects have made use of both reclaimed historical shutter hardware as well as used stainless sailing hardware for new projects. Other uses are closet doors, barn doors, storm doors, etc. All uses require hold backs of some sort to keep shutter or door from "flapping in the wind".

=== Sailing ===
In sailing, pintles insert into gudgeons that are normally affixed to the transom of a boat. Normally, the corresponding pintle fitting on the rudder slides, lowers or clips into the gudgeon. There are variations where gudgeons are mounted to the rudder and boat, and a pivot clevis pin is inserted into these gudgeons, or the pintles are fastened to the boat, and gudgeons are attached to the rudder. In any case, the fitting with the hole is referred to as a gudgeon. They are used to attach the rudder to the boat so that it can swing freely. The rudder can then be turned with the tiller. There must be at least two gudgeon/pintle sets for stability in the rudder's attachment to the transom. The pintles must face the same direction for insertion into the gudgeons and usually one is a bit longer so it can be the first into its gudgeon, giving some stability for the insertion of the other pintle. To prevent the rudder from rising out of the gudgeons there is often some preventer such as rudder weight or a locking device slid across the path of the pintle's removal from the upper gudgeon (also referred to as a Rudder Stop). High-quality gudgeons have bushings, (plain bearing) either a solid sleeve, flanged or clenched. This will allow for smoother operation of the helm and preserve the pintles and gudgeons. A bushing can be seen as "consumable".

On some boats there are split pins/split rings through the pintail to stop gudgeons lifting. In addition while the bottom fitting is a gudgeon turning on a pintail the upper two fittings are a pair of gudgeons each with a pin joining them with split pin/washer to stop them coming out.

=== Lock Gates ===
In shipping locks, the upper pivot point for a miter gate is referred to as the gudgeon, and carries horizontal loads caused by a gate leaf hanging with no water load. The lower pivot, which carries the weight of the leaf, is referred to as the pintle.

== See also ==
- Hinge
- Pintle
