= Crosshead =

Sliding pin joint in a slider-crank linkage, commonly used in engine pistons

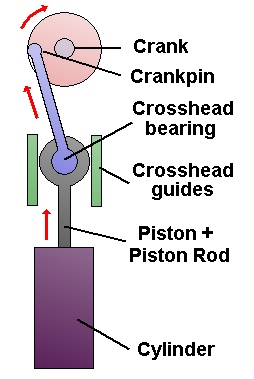
A crosshead as part of a reciprocating piston and slider-crank linkage mechanism.

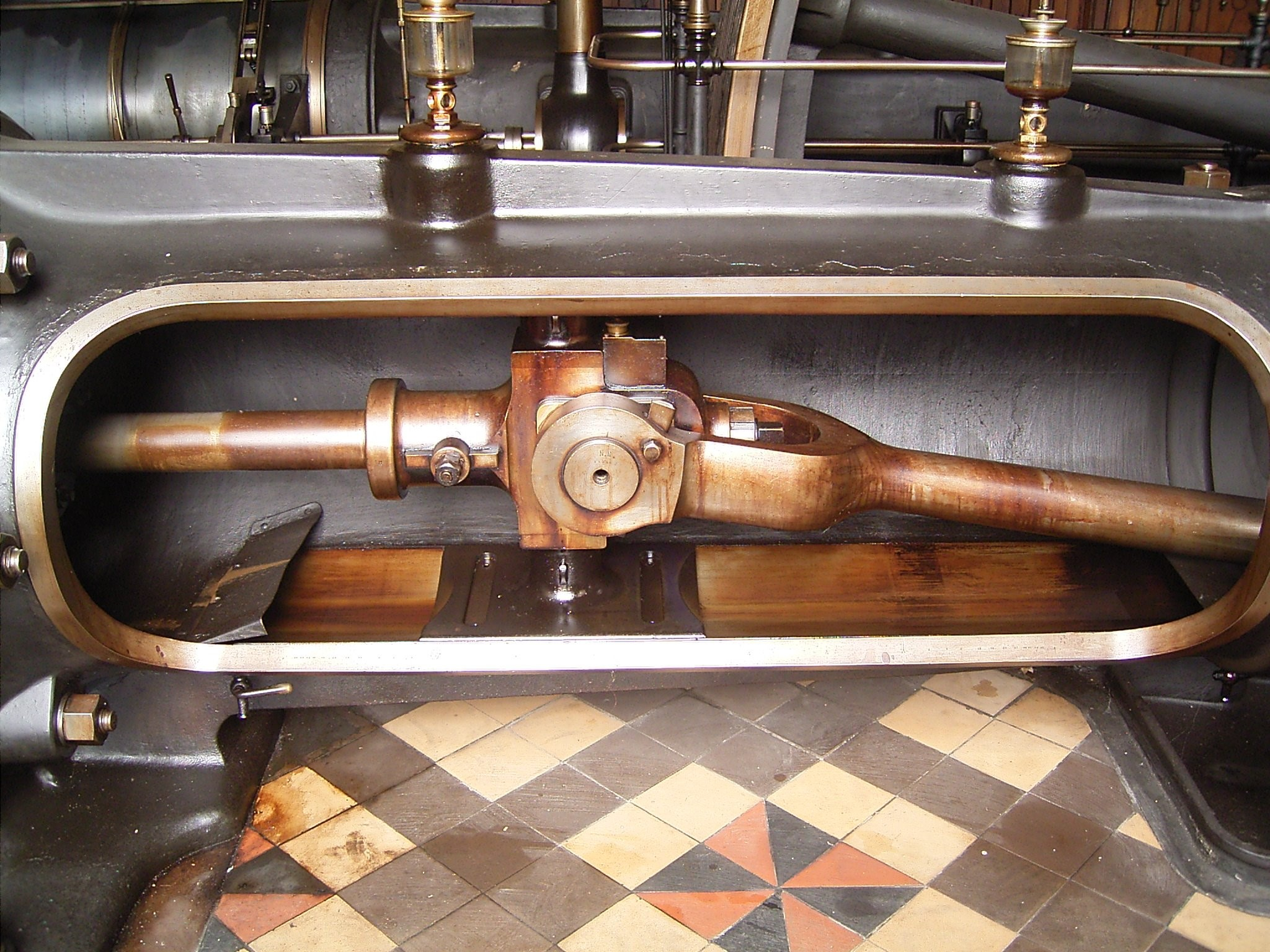
Cylindrical trunk guide

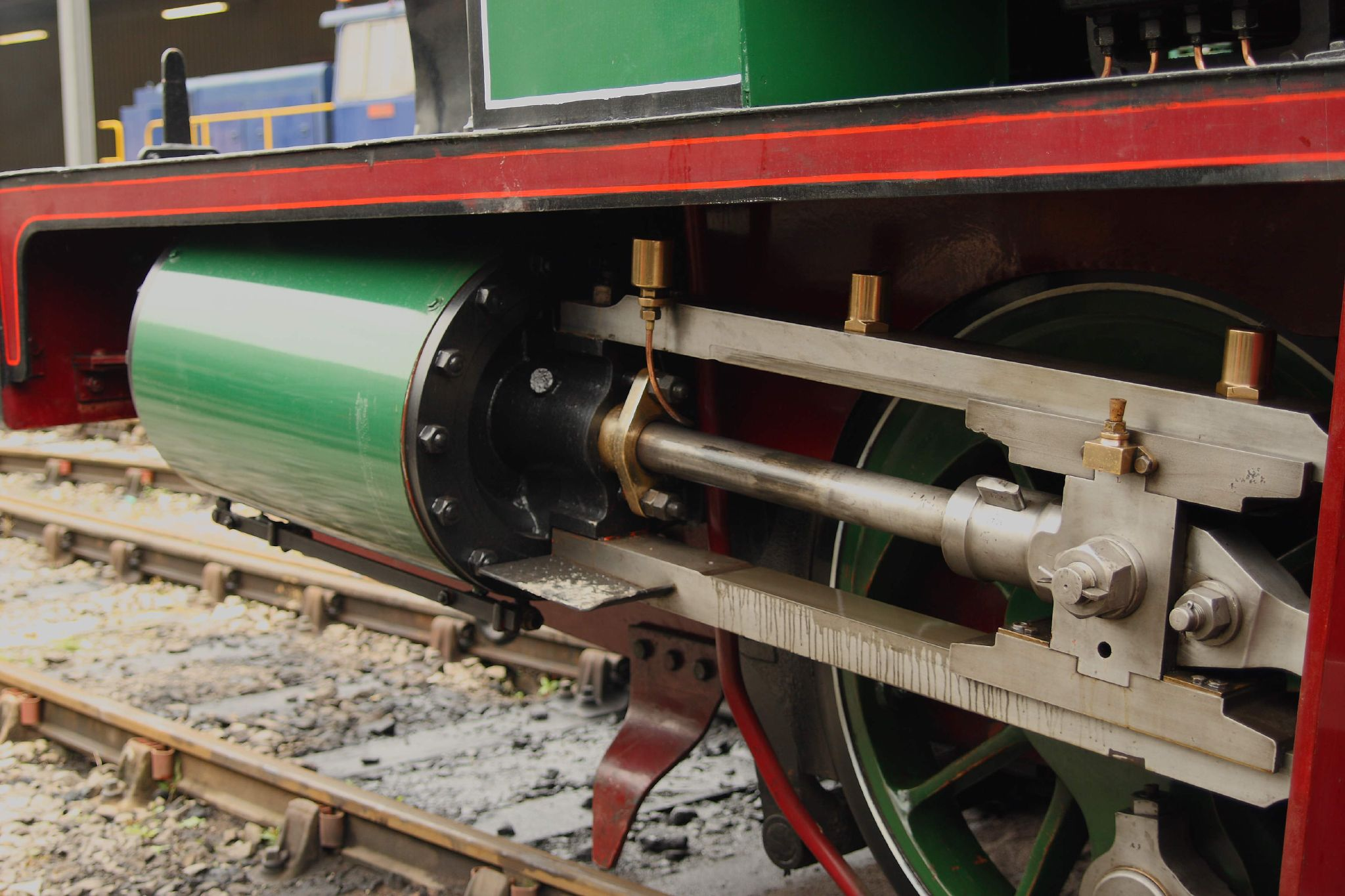
Hudswell Clarke Nunlow; crosshead and two slide bars

In mechanical engineering, a crosshead is a mechanical joint used as part of the slider-crank linkages of long stroke reciprocating engines (either internal combustion or steam) and reciprocating compressors to eliminate sideways force on the piston. The crosshead also allows the connecting rod to move freely outside the cylinder. Because of the very small bore-to-stroke ratio on such engines, the connecting rod would hit the cylinder walls and block the engine from rotating if the piston were attached directly to the connecting rod as in a trunk engine. Therefore, the longitudinal dimension of the crosshead must be matched to the stroke of the engine.

== Overview ==
On smaller engines, the connecting rod links the piston and the crankshaft directly, but this transmits sideways forces to the piston, since the crankpin (and thus the direction the force is applied) moves from side to side with the rotary motion of the crank. These transverse forces are tolerable in a relatively small engine. A larger engine's much greater forces would cause an intolerable degree of wear on the piston and cylinder, as well as increasing overall friction in the engine.

A piston rod is attached to the piston and links it to the crosshead, which is a large casting sliding in crosshead guides (UK: slidebar), allowing it only to move in the same direction as the piston travel. The crosshead also houses the gudgeon pin (US: wristpin) on which the small end of the connecting rod pivots. In this way, the transverse forces are applied only to the crosshead and its bearings, not to the piston itself.

== Internal combustion engines ==
Internal combustion engines using crossheads make for easier maintenance of the top end of the engine, since the pistons can be easily removed. The piston rod is mounted on the underside of the piston and connected to the crosshead by a single nut in double acting engines. The large two-stroke marine diesel engines are usually of this pattern. A crosshead is essential in a double-acting diesel engine (see also: H-class battleships: 12 MAN double-acting 2-stroke 9-cylinder diesels). Large diesels often have a plunger oil pump directly attached to the crosshead to supply oil under high pressure to the crosshead bearing.

== Steam engines ==
In the case of the steam engine, a crosshead is essential if the engine is to be double acting - steam is applied to both sides of the piston, which requires a seal around the piston rod. An exception is the oscillating cylinder steam engine which can be double acting and yet has no crosshead.

Early double-acting steam engines, such as those designed by James Watt, relied on a parallel motion linkage in part due to the difficulty of manufacturing guide rails. The cross head was made possible by the introduction of the planer which was suited for producing guides.

=== Locomotives ===
Crossheads in a steam locomotive can be mounted either to one guide mounted above the crosshead or to two, one above and one below (called an alligator crosshead since it has two "jaws"). The former was preferred in many more modern locomotives.

=== Marine engines ===
In many 19th century marine steam engines, the crosshead was a strong metal bar attached to the piston rod and perpendicular to it, which was sometimes used to eliminate transverse forces, as in a steeple engine, and at other times used as a linkage—to side-rods in a side-lever engine or to connecting rods in a square engine.

== See also ==
- Crosshead piston
- in which the lateral force of the piston is eliminated
