= Crankshaft =

Mechanism for converting reciprocating motion to rotation

Crankshaft (red), pistons (gray), cylinders (blue) and flywheel (black)

A crankshaft is a mechanical component used in a piston engine to convert the reciprocating motion into rotational motion. The crankshaft is a rotating shaft containing one or more crankpins, that are driven by the pistons via the connecting rods.

The crankpins are also called rod bearing journals, and they rotate within the "big end" of the connecting rods.

Most modern crankshafts are located in the engine block. They are made from steel or cast iron, using either a forging, casting or machining process.

== Design ==
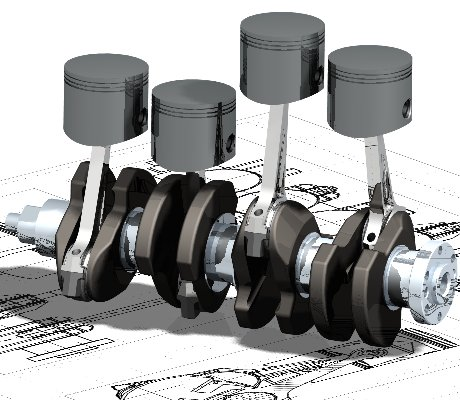
Crankshaft, pistons and connecting rods for a typical internal combustion engine

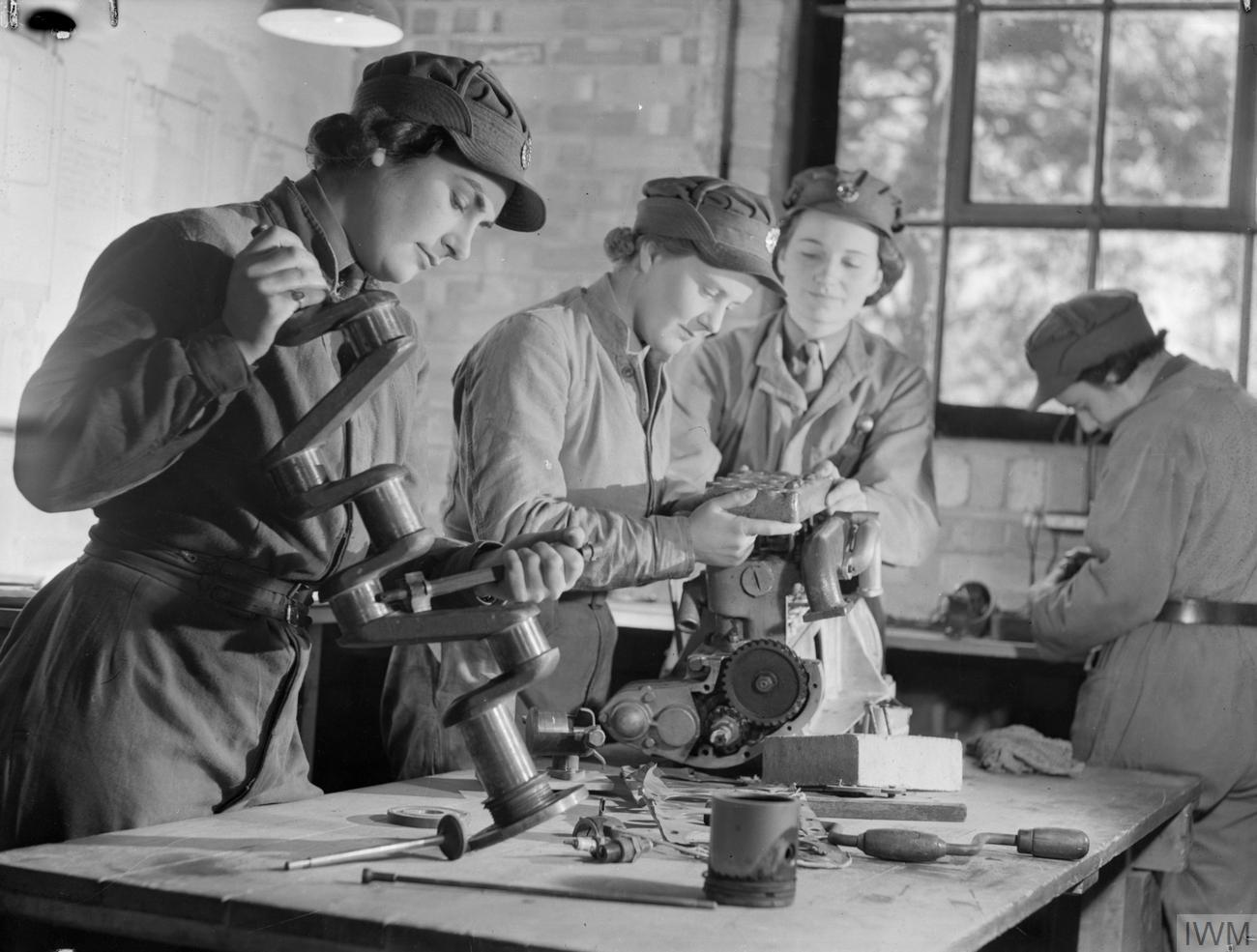
An ATS trainee examining a crankshaft, 1941

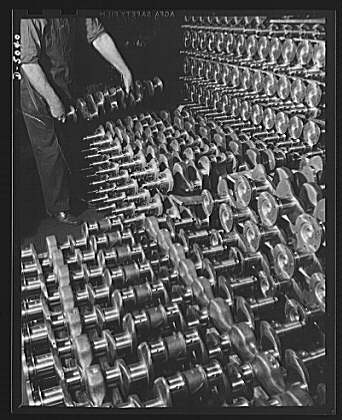
Marine engine crankshafts from 1942

The crankshaft is located within the engine block and held in place via main bearings which allow the crankshaft to rotate within the block. The up-down motion of each piston is transferred to the crankshaft via connecting rods. A flywheel is often attached to one end of the crankshaft, in order to smooth power delivery and reduce vibration.

A crankshaft is subjected to enormous stresses, in some cases more than 8.6 tonnes (19,000 pounds) per cylinder. Crankshafts for single-cylinder engines are usually a simpler design than for engines with multiple cylinders.

=== Bearings ===
The crankshaft is able to rotate in the engine block due to the 'main bearings'. Since the crankshaft is subject to large horizontal and torsional forces from each cylinder, these main bearings are located at various points along the crankshaft, rather than just one at each end. The number of main bearings is determined based on the overall load factor and the maximum engine speed. Crankshafts in diesel engines often use a main bearing between every cylinder and at both ends of the crankshaft, due to the high forces of combustion present.

Flexing of the crankshaft was a factor in replacing straight-eight engines in the 1950s; the long crankshafts suffered from an unacceptable amount of flex when engine designers began using higher compression ratios and higher engine speeds (RPM).

=== Piston stroke ===
The distance between the axis of the crankpins and the axis of the crankshaft determines the stroke length of the engine.

Most modern car engines are classified as "over square" or short-stroke, wherein the stroke is less than the diameter of the cylinder bore. A common way to increase the low-RPM torque of an engine is to increase the stroke, sometimes known as "stroking" the engine. Historically, the trade-off for a long-stroke engine was a lower rev limit and increased vibration at high RPM, due to the increased piston velocity.

=== Cross-plane and flat-plane configurations ===
When designing an engine, the crankshaft configuration is closely related to the engine's firing order.

Most production V8 engines (such as the Ford Modular engine and the General Motors LS engine) use a cross-plane crank whereby the crank throws are spaced 90 degrees apart. However, some high-performance V8 engines (such as the Ferrari 488) instead use a flat-plane crank, whereby the throws are spaced 180° apart, which essentially results in two inline-four engines sharing a common crankcase. Flat-plane engines are usually able to operate at higher RPM, however they have higher second-order vibrations, so they are better suited to racing car engines.

=== Engine balance ===
Balancing an engine is important to improve engine vibration, performance, and longevity. Counterweights on the crankshaft serve to cancel the rotating and reciprocating masses in the crankshaft-rod-piston assembly. Since pistons and connecting rods can vary in mass, the amount of mass in the counterweights must be varied to balance the engine. This is done by removing material or adding a dense material to tune the mass in the counterweights.

=== Flying arms ===
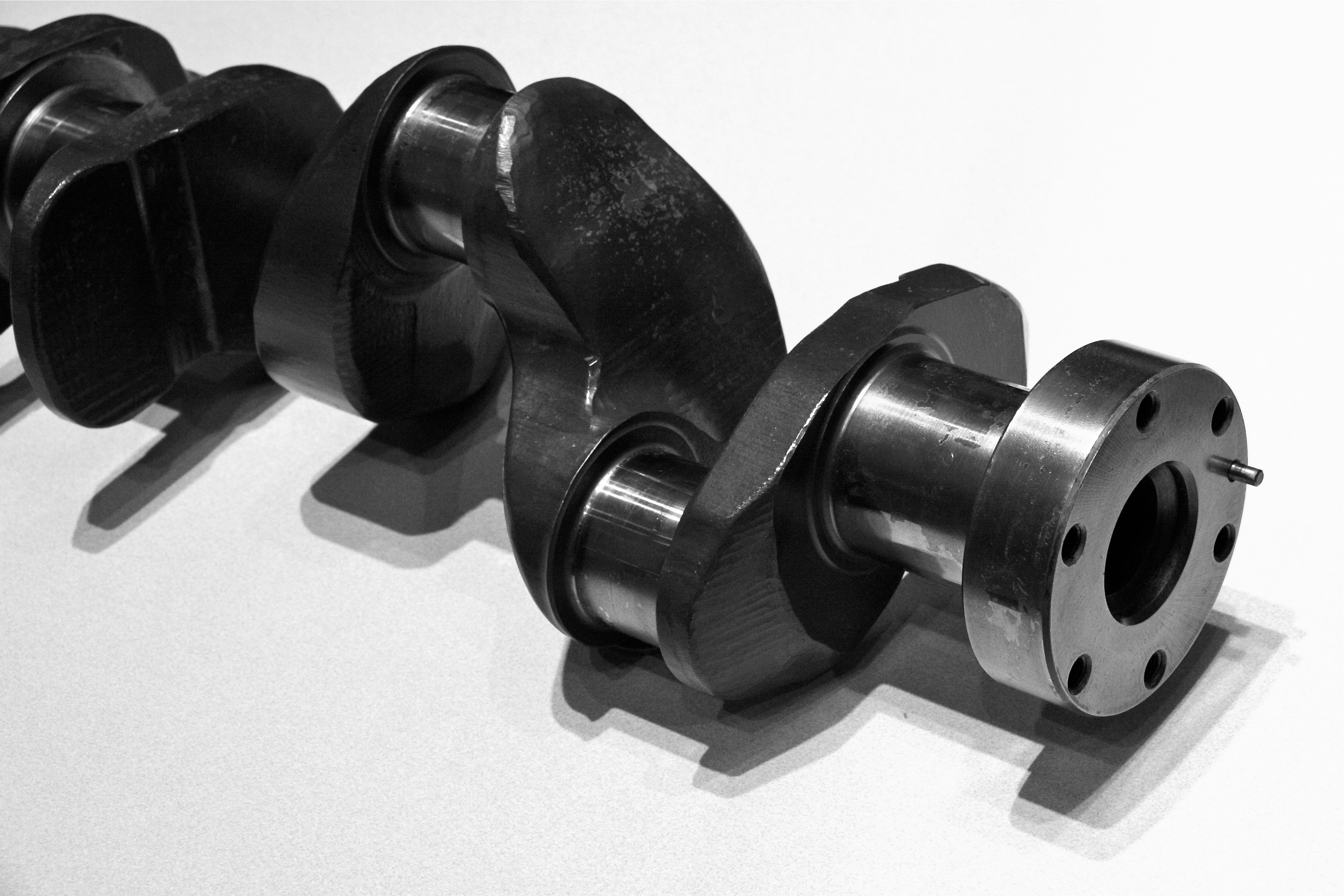
Flying arm (the boomerang-shaped link between first and second crankpins on a crankshaft)

In some engines, the crankshaft contains direct links between adjacent crankpins, without the usual intermediate main bearing. These links are called flying arms. This arrangement is sometimes used in V6 and V8 engines, in order to maintain an even firing interval while using different V angles, and to reduce the number of main bearings required. The downside of flying arms is that the rigidity of the crankshaft is reduced, which can cause problems at high RPM or high power outputs.

=== Counter-rotating crankshafts ===
In most engines, each connecting rod is attached to a single crankshaft, which results in the angle of the connecting rod varying as the piston moves through its stroke. This variation in angle pushes the pistons against the cylinder wall, which causes friction between the piston and cylinder wall. To prevent this, some early engines – such as the 1900–1904 Lanchester Engine Company flat-twin engines – connected each piston to two crankshafts that rotated in opposite directions. This arrangement cancels out the lateral forces and reduces the requirement for counterweights. This design is rarely used; however a similar principle applies to balance shafts, which are occasionally used.

=== Eccentricity and dynamic displacement of diesel engines ===
Eccentricity and dynamic displacement are critical factors influencing the performance, efficiency, and durability of diesel engines. These phenomena arise due to the flexibility of the crankshaft, secondary piston motion, and varying loads during engine operation. Understanding these effects is essential for reducing mechanical wear, improving fuel efficiency, and optimizing engine design.

== Construction ==
=== Forged crankshafts ===
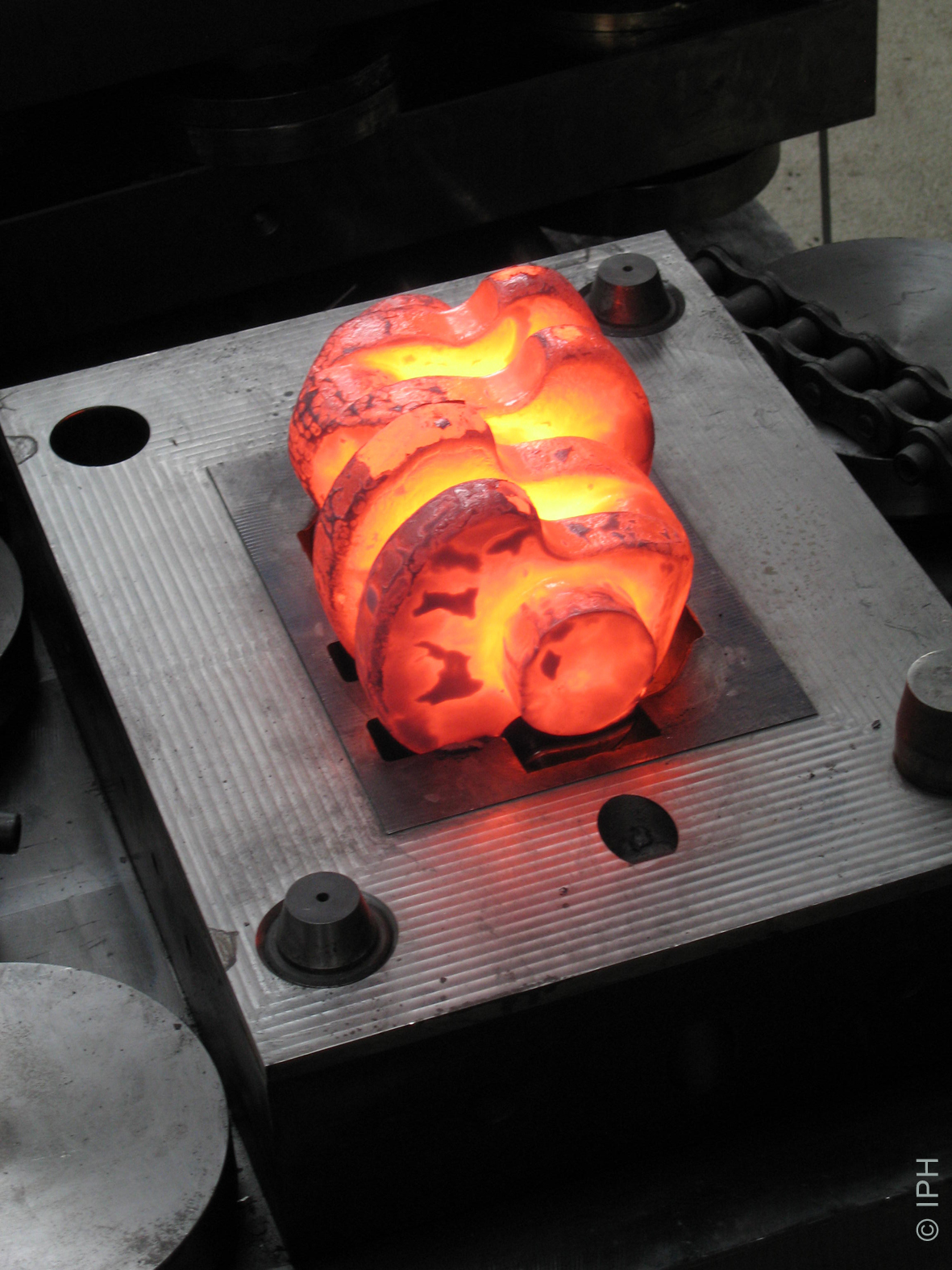
Forged crankshaft

Crankshafts can be created from a steel bar using roll forging. Today, manufacturers tend to favour the use of forged crankshafts due to their lighter weight, more compact dimensions and better inherent damping. With forged crankshafts, vanadium micro-alloyed steels are mainly used as these steels can be air-cooled after reaching high strengths without additional heat treatment, except for the surface hardening of the bearing surfaces. The low alloy content also makes the material cheaper than high-alloy steels. Carbon steels also require additional heat treatment to reach the desired properties.

=== Cast crankshafts ===
Another construction method is to cast the crankshaft from ductile iron. Cast iron crankshafts are today mostly found in cheaper production engines where the loads are lower.

=== Machined crankshafts ===
Crankshafts can also be machined from billet, often a bar of high quality vacuum remelted steel. Though the fiber flow (local inhomogeneities of the material's chemical composition generated during casting) does not follow the shape of the crankshaft (which is undesirable), this is usually not a problem since higher quality steels, which normally are difficult to forge, can be used. Per unit, these crankshafts tend to be expensive due to the large amount of material that must be removed with lathes and milling machines, the high material cost, and the additional heat treatment required. However, since no expensive tooling is needed, this production method allows small production runs without high up-front costs.

== History ==
=== Crankshaft ===
In 9th century Abbasid Baghdad, automatically operated cranks appear in several of the hydraulic devices described by the Banū Mūsā brothers in the Book of Ingenious Devices. These automatically operated cranks appear in several devices, two of which contain an action which approximates to that of a crankshaft, five centuries before the earliest known European description of a crankshaft. However, the automatic crank mechanism described by the Banū Mūsā would not have allowed a full rotation, but only a small modification was required to convert it to a crankshaft.

In the Artuqid Sultanate, Arab engineer Ismail al-Jazari (1136–1206) described a crank and connecting rod system in a rotating machine for two of his water-raising machines, which include both crank and shaft mechanisms.

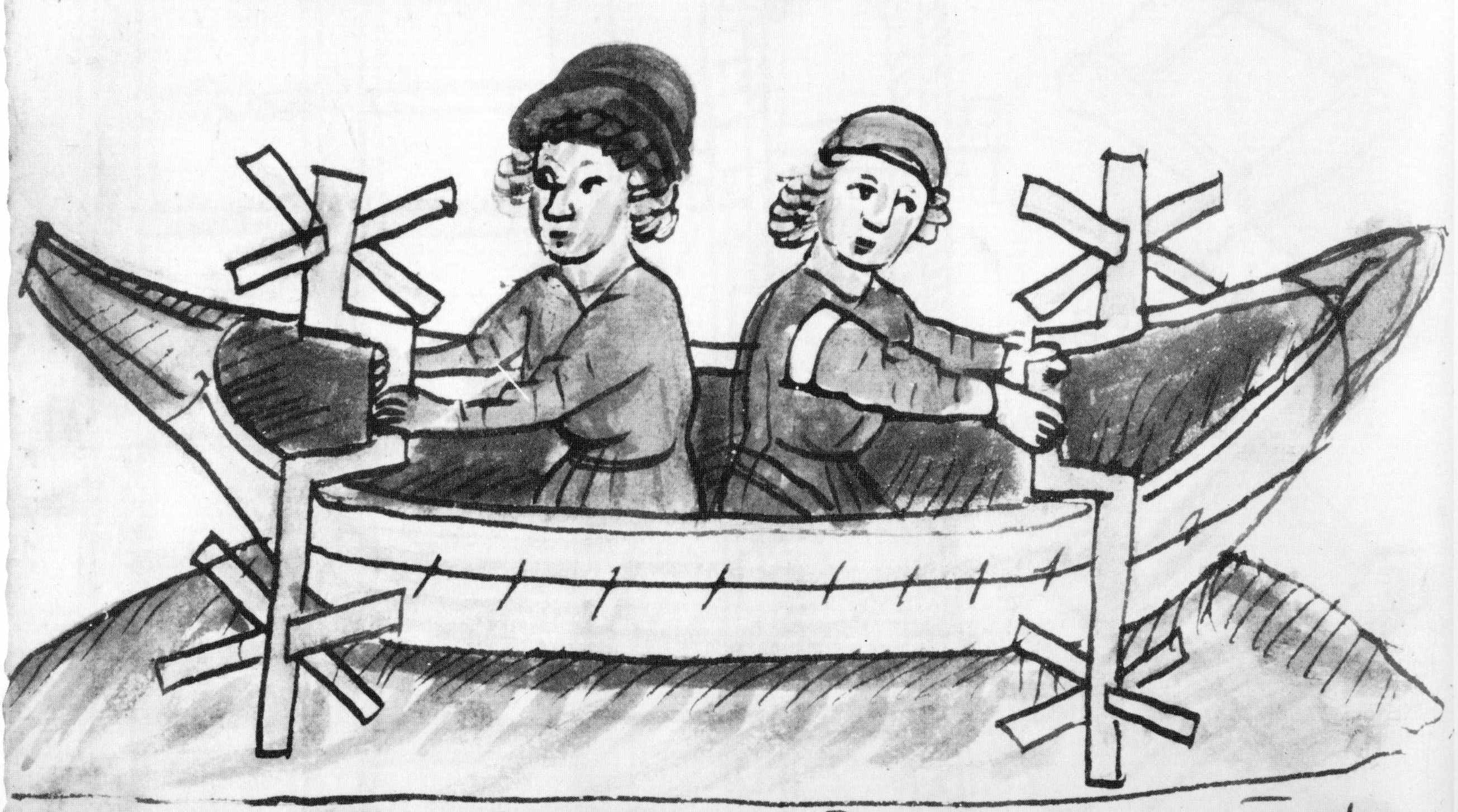
15th century paddle-wheel boat

The Italian physician Guido da Vigevano (c. 1280 – c. 1349), planning for a new Crusade, made illustrations for a paddle boat and war carriages that were propelled by manually turned compound cranks and gear wheels, identified as an early crankshaft prototype by Lynn Townsend White.

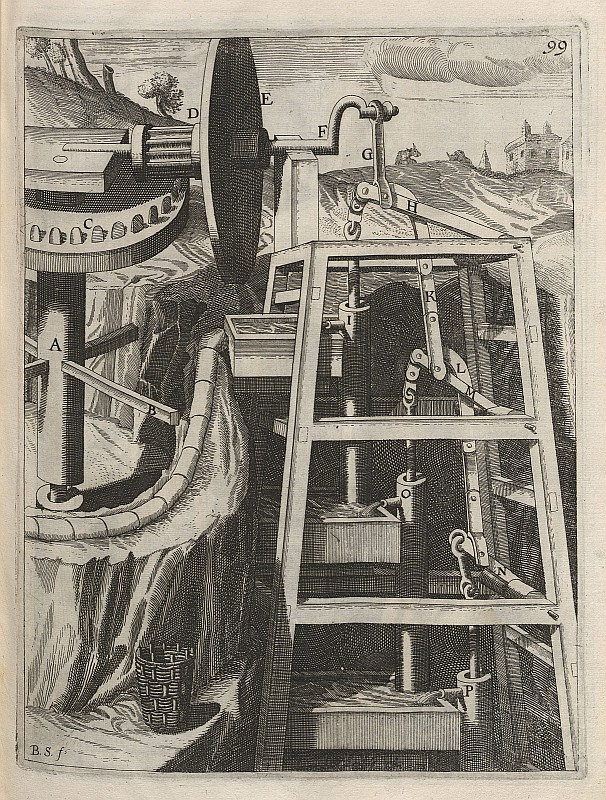
1661 water pump by Georg Andreas Böckler

Crankshafts were described by Leonardo da Vinci (1452–1519) and a Dutch farmer and windmill owner by the name Cornelis Corneliszoon van Uitgeest in 1592. His wind-powered sawmill used a crankshaft to convert a windmill's circular motion into a back-and-forward motion powering the saw. Corneliszoon was granted a patent for his crankshaft in 1597.

From the 16th century onwards, evidence of cranks and connecting rods integrated into machine design becomes abundant in the technological treatises of the period: Agostino Ramelli's The Diverse and Artifactitious Machines of 1588 depicts eighteen examples, a number that rises in the Theatrum Machinarum Novum by Georg Andreas Böckler to 45 different machines. Cranks were formerly common on some machines in the early 20th century; for example almost all phonographs before the 1930s were powered by clockwork motors wound with cranks. Reciprocating piston engines use cranks to convert the linear piston motion into rotational motion. Internal combustion engines of early 20th century automobiles were usually started with hand cranks, before electric starters came into general use.

== See also ==
- Bicycle crankset
- Brace (tool)
- Cam (mechanism)
- Cam engine
- Camshaft
- Crank (mechanism)
- Crankcase
- Crankshaft torsional vibration
- List of auto parts
- Piston motion equations
- Tunnel crankshaft
- Scotch yoke
- Swashplate

== Sources ==
- Frankel, Rafael (2003), "The Olynthus Mill, Its Origin, and Diffusion: Typology and Distribution", American Journal of Archaeology, 107 (1): 1–21, doi:10.3764/aja.107.1.1, S2CID 192167193
- Hägermann, Dieter; Schneider, Helmuth (1997), Technikgeschichte Landbau und Handwerk, 750 v. Chr. bis 1000 n. Chr. (2nd ed.), Berlin: Propyläen, ISBN 3-549-05632-X
- Hall, Bert S. (1979), The Technological Illustrations of the So-Called "Anonymous of the Hussite Wars". Codex Latinus Monacensis 197, Part 1, Wiesbaden: Dr. Ludwig Reichert Verlag, ISBN 3-920153-93-6
- al-Hassan, Ahmad Y.; Hill, Donald R. (1992), Islamic Technology. An Illustrated History, Cambridge University Press, ISBN 0-521-42239-6
- Laur-Belart, Rudolf (1988), Führer durch Augusta Raurica (5th ed.), Augst: Römermuseum Augst, ISBN 978-3715150017
- Lucas, Adam Robert (2005), "Industrial Milling in the Ancient and Medieval Worlds. A Survey of the Evidence for an Industrial Revolution in Medieval Europe", Technology and Culture, 46 (1): 1–30, doi:10.1353/tech.2005.0026, S2CID 109564224
- Mangartz, Fritz (2006), "Zur Rekonstruktion der wassergetriebenen byzantinischen Steinsägemaschine von Ephesos, Türkei. Vorbericht", Archäologisches Korrespondenzblatt, 36 (1): 573–590
- Mangartz, Fritz (2010), Die byzantinische Steinsäge von Ephesos. Baubefund, Rekonstruktion, Architekturteile, Monographs of the RGZM, vol. 86, Mainz: Römisch-Germanisches Zentralmuseum, ISBN 978-3-88467-149-8
- Needham, Joseph (1986), Science and Civilisation in China: Volume 4, Physics and Physical Technology: Part 2, Mechanical Engineering, Cambridge University Press, ISBN 0-521-05803-1
- Nunney, Malcolm J. (2007), Light and Heavy Vehicle Technology (4th ed.), Elsevier Butterworth-Heinemann, ISBN 978-0-7506-8037-0
- Ritti, Tullia; Grewe, Klaus; Kessener, Paul (2007), "A Relief of a Water-powered Stone Saw Mill on a Sarcophagus at Hierapolis and its Implications", Journal of Roman Archaeology, 20: 138–163, doi:10.1017/S1047759400005341, S2CID 161937987
- Schiöler, Thorkild (2009), "Die Kurbelwelle von Augst und die römische Steinsägemühle", Helvetia Archaeologica, vol. 40, no. 159/160, pp. 113–124
- Volpert, Hans-Peter (1997). "Eine römische Kurbelmühle aus Aschheim, Lkr. München". Bericht der Bayerischen Bodendenkmalpflege. 38: 193–199. ISBN 3-7749-2903-3.
- White, Lynn Jr. (1962), Medieval Technology and Social Change, Oxford: At the Clarendon Press
- Wilson, Andrew (2002), "Machines, Power and the Ancient Economy", The Journal of Roman Studies, vol. 92, pp. 1–32
