= Slider crank chain inversion =

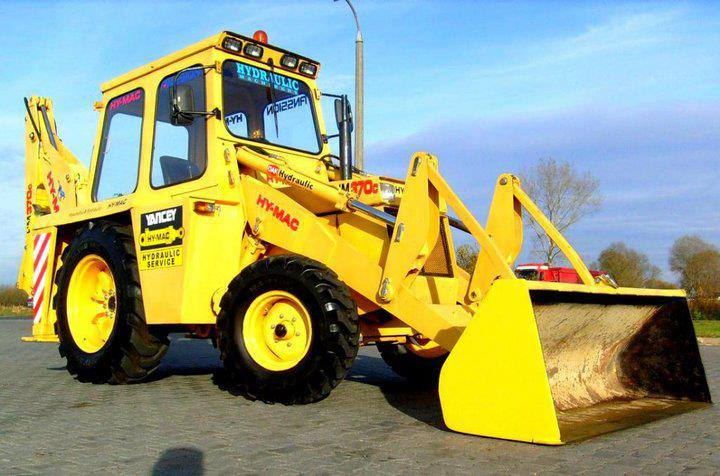
The linear actuators of a back hoe form inverted slider-crank linkages.

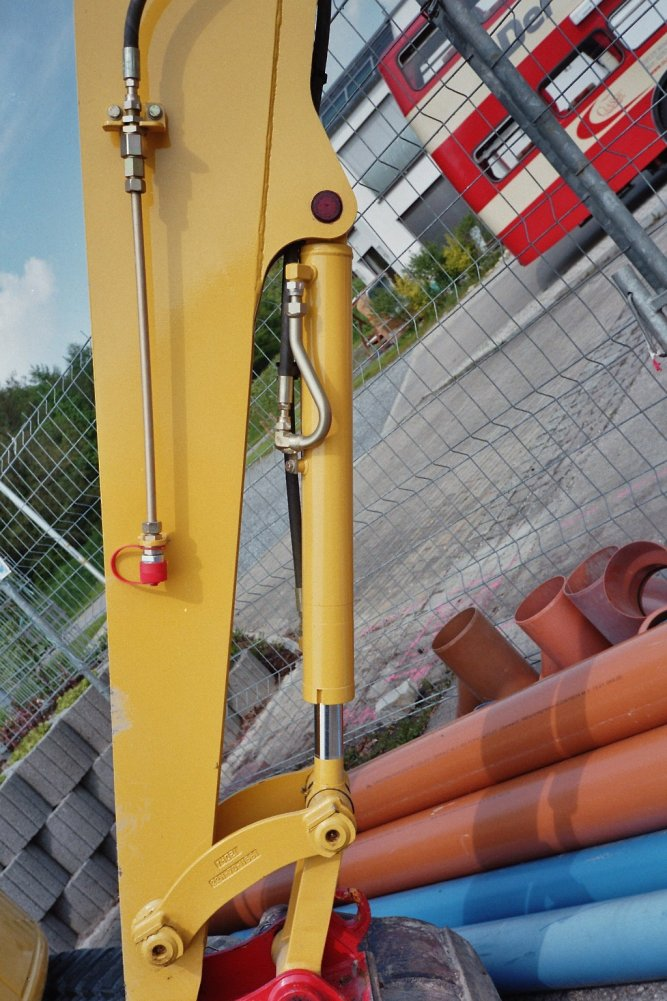
Close-up of the linear actuator of a back hoe that forms an inverted slider-crank.

Linear actuator actuates an inverted slider crank.

Slider-crank chain inversion arises when the connecting rod, or coupler, of a slider-crank linkage becomes the ground link, so the slider is connected directly to the crank. This inverted slider-crank is the form of a slider-crank linkage that is often used to actuate a hinged joint in construction equipment like a crane or backhoe, as well as to open and close a swinging gate or door.

== Slider-crank and its inversions ==
A slider-crank is a four-bar linkage that has a crank that rotates coupled to a slider that moves along a straight line.

This mechanism is composed of three important parts: The crank which is the rotating disc, the slider which slides inside the tube and the connecting rod which joins the parts together. As the slider moves to the right the connecting rod pushes the wheel round for the first 180 degrees of wheel rotation. When the slider begins to move back into the tube, the connecting rod pulls the wheel round to complete the rotation.

== Inversions ==
Different mechanism by fixing different link of slider crank chain are as follows :

First inversion

This inversion is obtained when link 1 (ground body) is fixed. Application- Reciprocating engine, Reciprocating compressor etc...

Second inversion

This inversion is obtained when link 2 (crank) is fixed. Application- Whitworth quick return mechanism, Rotary engine, etc...

Third inversion

This inversion is obtained when link 3 (connecting rod) is fixed. Applications - Slotted crank mechanism, Oscillatory engine etc..,

Fourth inversion

This inversion is obtained when link 4 (slider) is fixed. Application- Hand pump, pendulum pump or Bull engine, etc.
