= Crankpin =

Crankshaft section where connecting rods are attached

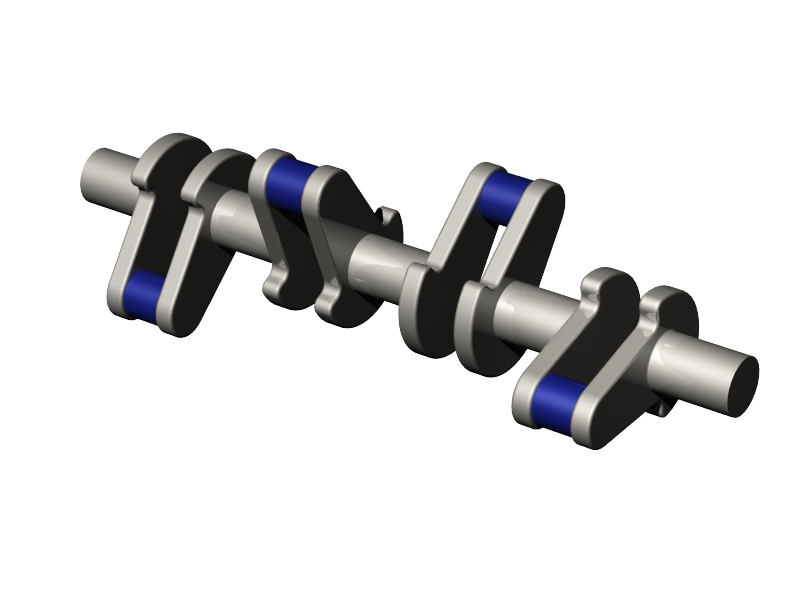
Crankpins highlighted in blue

A crankpin or crank pin, also known as a rod bearing journal, is a mechanical device in an engine which connects the crankshaft to the connecting rod for each cylinder. It has a cylindrical surface, to allow the crankpin to rotate relative to the "big end" of the connecting rod.

The most common configuration is for a crankpin to serve one cylinder. However, many V engines have each crankpin shared by each pair of cylinders.

== Design ==
The crankpin connects to the larger end of the connecting rod for each cylinder. This end of the connecting rod is called the "big end", as opposed to the "small end" or "little end" (which connects to the wrist/gudgeon pin in the piston).

The bearing which allows the crankpin to rotate around its shaft is called the "rod bearing". In automotive engines, the most common type of rod bearing is the plain bearing, however bushings or roller bearings are also used in some engines.

== Configurations ==
In a single-cylinder engine, straight engine or flat engine, each crankpin normally serves just one cylinder. This results for a relatively simple design which is the cheapest to produce. Some V-twin engines use a single cylinder per crankpin.

Most V engines have each pair of cylinders sharing a crankpin. This usually requires an offset between the cylinders in each bank, resulting in a simple connecting rod design. If a cylinder offset is not used, then the connecting rods must be articulated or forked at the big end. Forked connecting rods are mainly used in V-twin motorcycle engines, but in the past were found on a number of automobile and aero engines, such as the Rolls-Royce Merlin aero engine of the WWII era. Articulated connecting rods consist of a "master" rod attached to the crank pin, with a "slave" rod connected to the big end of the master rod. This design was used in older or exotic V engines.

Radial engines use a more complicated version of articulated connecting rods, where a single "master" connecting rod attached to the single crankpin (one for each row in multi-row designs), and smaller bearings for each of the corresponding cylinders machined into the big end of the master rod.

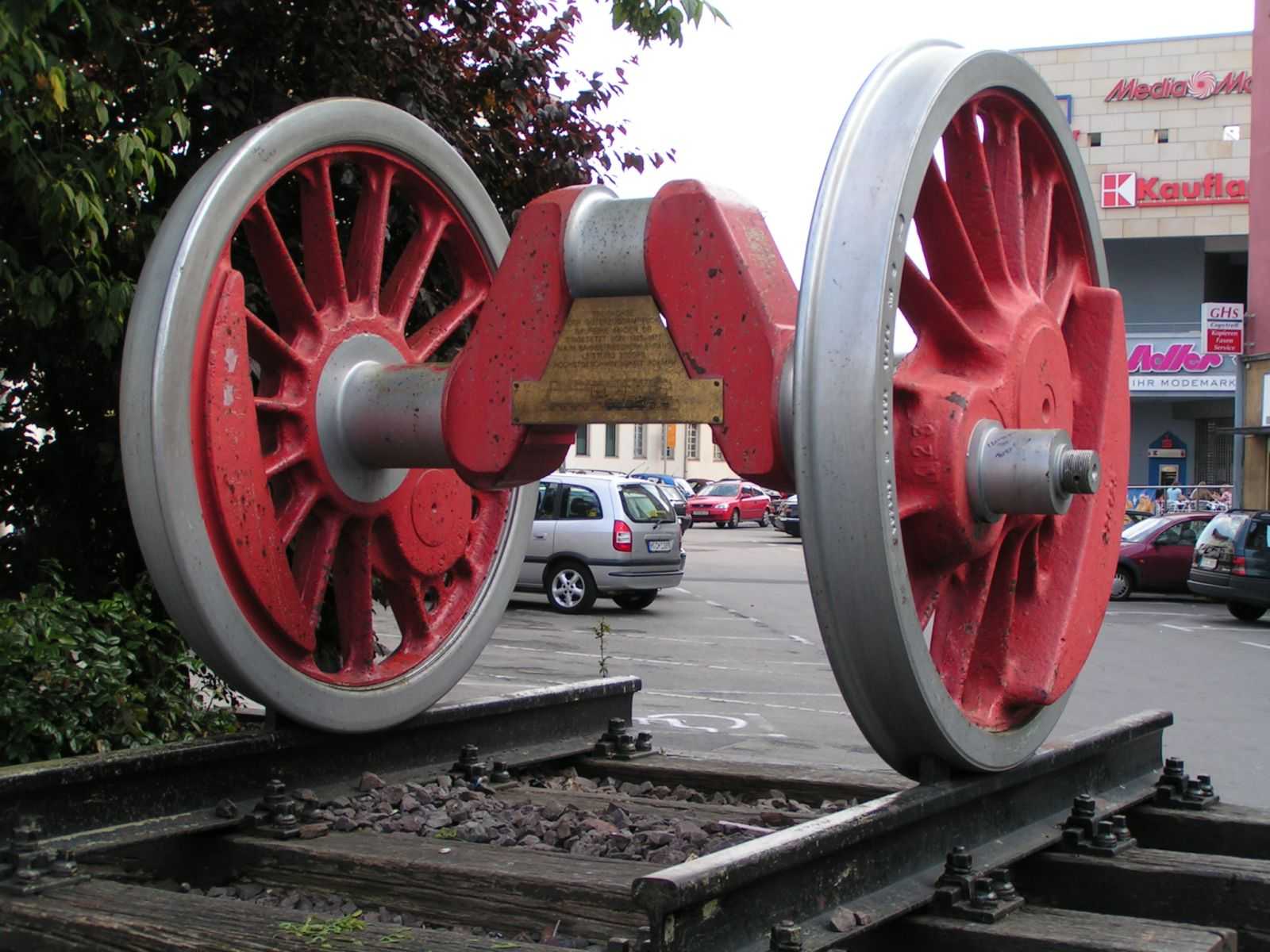
The driving wheels (crank axle) of a German Reichsbahn Class 44. The crank pin can be seen on the right hand wheel.

Cylindrical crank pins were fitted onto the driving wheels of steam locomotives. They were connected to the driving rods that transmitted power from the cylinder to the wheel. The crank pin was usually made of high-quality steel because it had to withstand high forces.

The crank pin of a locomotive corresponds to the offset of a crankshaft in other crank drives. The distance from the centre of the crank pin to the centre of the wheel is also called offset and is exactly half the stroke of the pistons.

== See also ==
- Crank (mechanism)
- Slider-crank linkage
