= Balance shaft =

Weights used to balance otherwise unbalanced engine movement

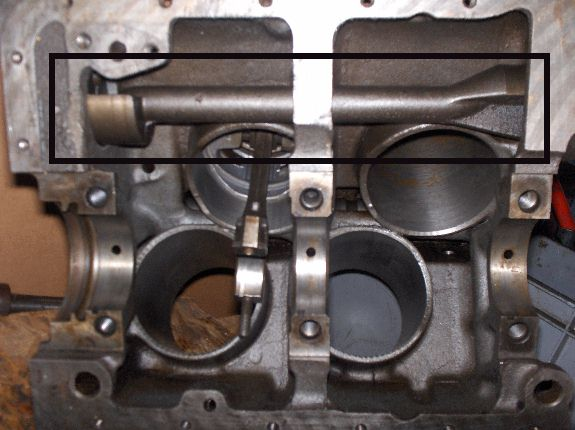
Balance shaft in Ford Taunus V4 engine.

Balance shafts are used in piston engines to reduce vibration by cancelling out unbalanced dynamic forces. The counter balance shafts have eccentric weights and rotate in the opposite direction to each other, which generates a net vertical force.

The balance shaft was invented and patented by British engineer Frederick W. Lanchester in 1907. It is most commonly used in inline-four and V6 engines used in automobiles and motorcycles.

== Overview ==
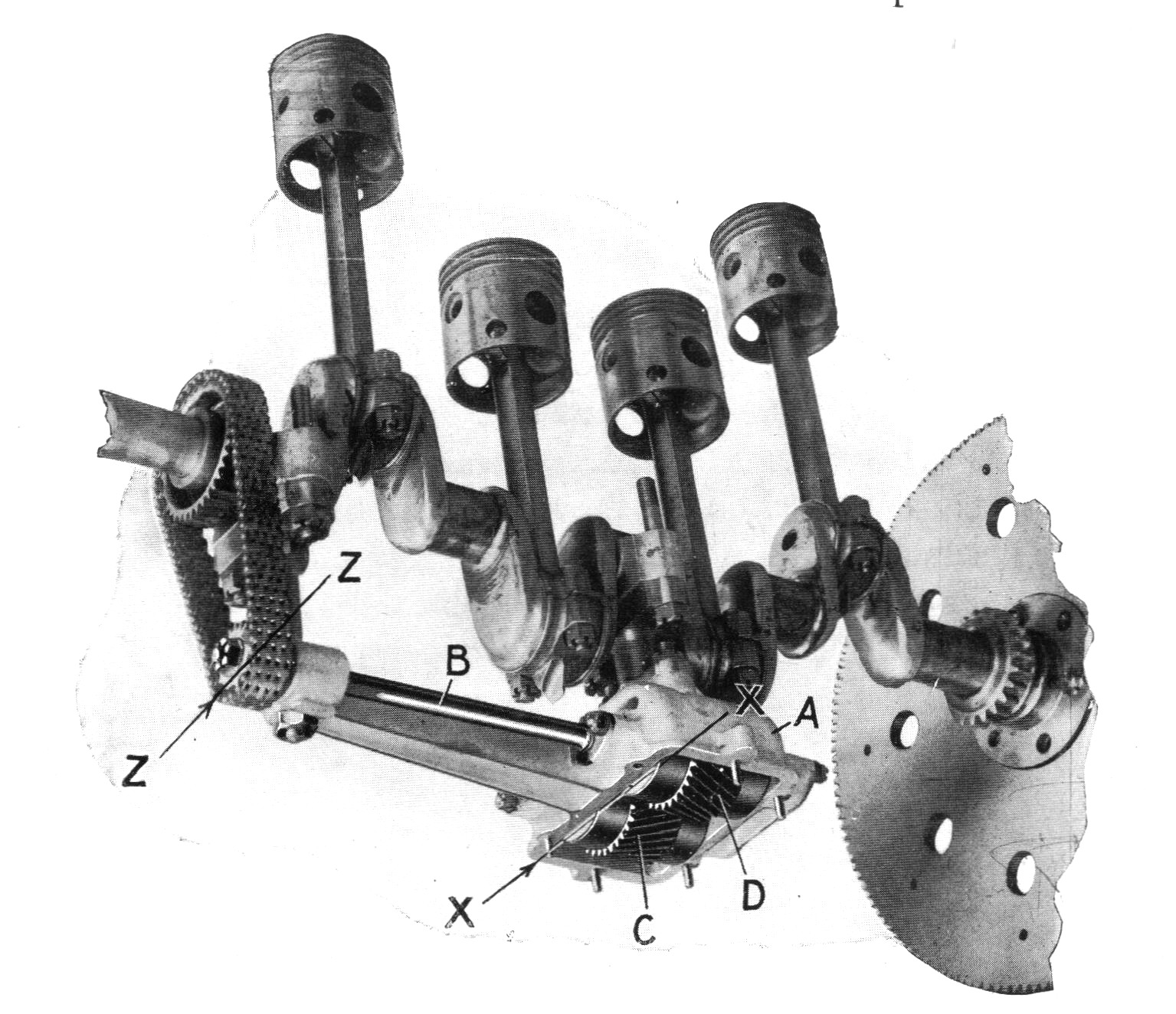
Lanchester's vertical force balancer. The eccentric masses are labelled "C" and "D".

The operating principle of a balance shaft system is that two shafts carrying identical eccentric weights rotate in opposite directions at twice the engine speed. The phasing of the shafts is such that the centrifugal forces produced by the weights cancel the vertical second-order forces (at twice the engine RPM) produced by the engine. The horizontal forces produced by the balance shafts are equal and opposite, and so cancel each other.

The balance shafts do not reduce the vibrations experienced by the crankshaft.

== Applications ==
=== Two-cylinder engines ===
Numerous motorcycle engines— particularly parallel-twin engines— have employed balance shaft systems, for example the Yamaha TRX850 and Yamaha TDM850 engines have a 270° crankshaft with a balance shaft. An alternative approach, as used by the BMW GS parallel-twin, is to use a 'dummy' connecting rod which moves a hinged counterweight.

=== Four-cylinder engines ===
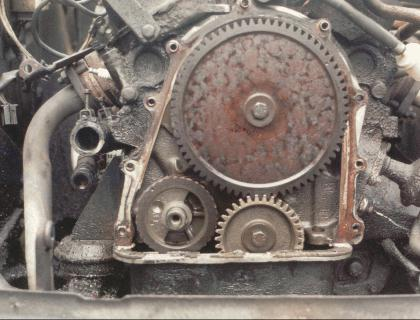
Valve timing gears on a Ford Taunus V4 engine. The balance shaft runs off the small gear on the left (the large gear is for the camshaft, causing it to rotate at half the speed of the crankshaft).

Balance shafts are often used in inline-four engines, to reduce the second-order vibration (a vertical force oscillating at twice the engine RPM) that is inherent in the design of a typical inline-four engine. This vibration is generated because the movement of the connecting rods in an even-firing inline-four engine is not symmetrical throughout the crankshaft rotation; thus during a given period of crankshaft rotation, the descending and ascending pistons are not always completely opposed in their acceleration, giving rise to a net vertical force twice in each revolution (which increases quadratically with RPM).

The amount of vibration also increases with engine displacement, resulting in balance shafts often being used in inline-four engines with displacements of 2.2 L (134 cu in) or more. Both an increased stroke or bore cause an increased secondary vibration; a larger stroke increases the difference in acceleration and a larger bore increases the mass of the pistons.

The Lanchester design of balance shaft systems was refined with the Mitsubishi Astron 80, an inline-four car engine introduced in 1975. This engine was the first to locate one balance shaft higher than the other, to counteract the second order rolling couple (i.e. about the crankshaft axis) due to the torque exerted by the inertia caused by increases and decreases in engine speed.

In a flat-four engine, the forces are cancelled out by the pistons moving in opposite directions. Therefore balance shafts are not needed in flat-four engines.

=== Five-cylinder engines ===
Balance shafts are also used in straight-five engines such as GM Vortec 3700.

=== Six-cylinder engines ===
In a straight-six engine and flat-six engine, the rocking forces are naturally balanced out, therefore balance shafts are not required.

V6 engines are inherently unbalanced, regardless of the V-angle. Any inline engine with an odd number of cylinders has a primary imbalance, which causes an end-to-end rocking motion. As each cylinder bank in a V6 has three cylinders, each cylinder bank experiences this motion. Balance shaft(s) are used on various V6 engines to reduce this rocking motion.

=== Eight-cylinder engines ===
Examples are the Mercedes-Benz OM629 and Volvo B8444S engine.

== See also ==
- Balancing machine
- Engine balance
