= List of early medieval watermills =

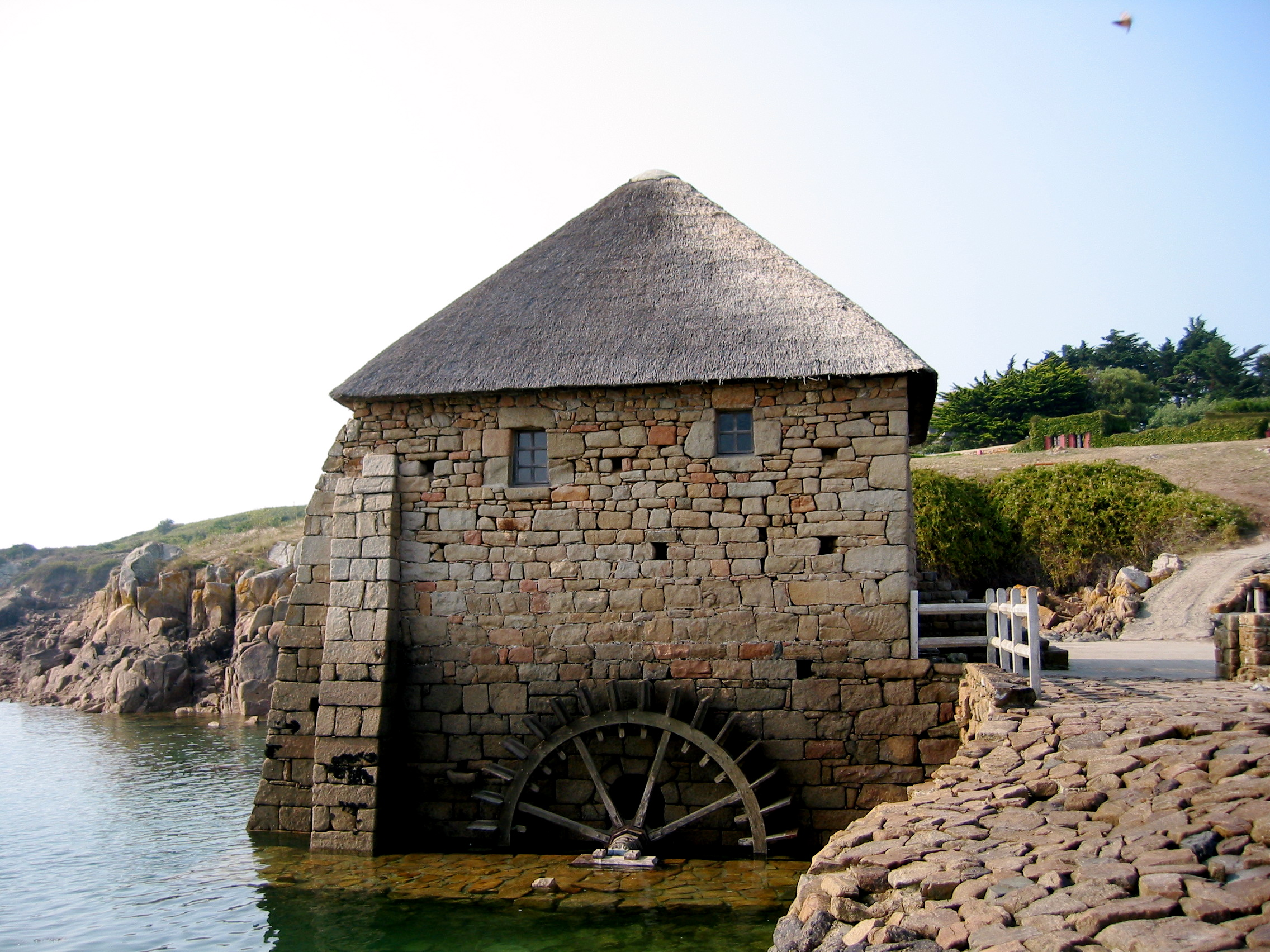
Tide mills, along with riverine ship mills, were a major early medieval technological advance, allowing to tap the tidal power along the Atlantic Coast for milling.

This list of early medieval watermills comprises a selection of European watermills spanning the early Middle Ages, from 500 to 1000 AD.

== Historical overview ==
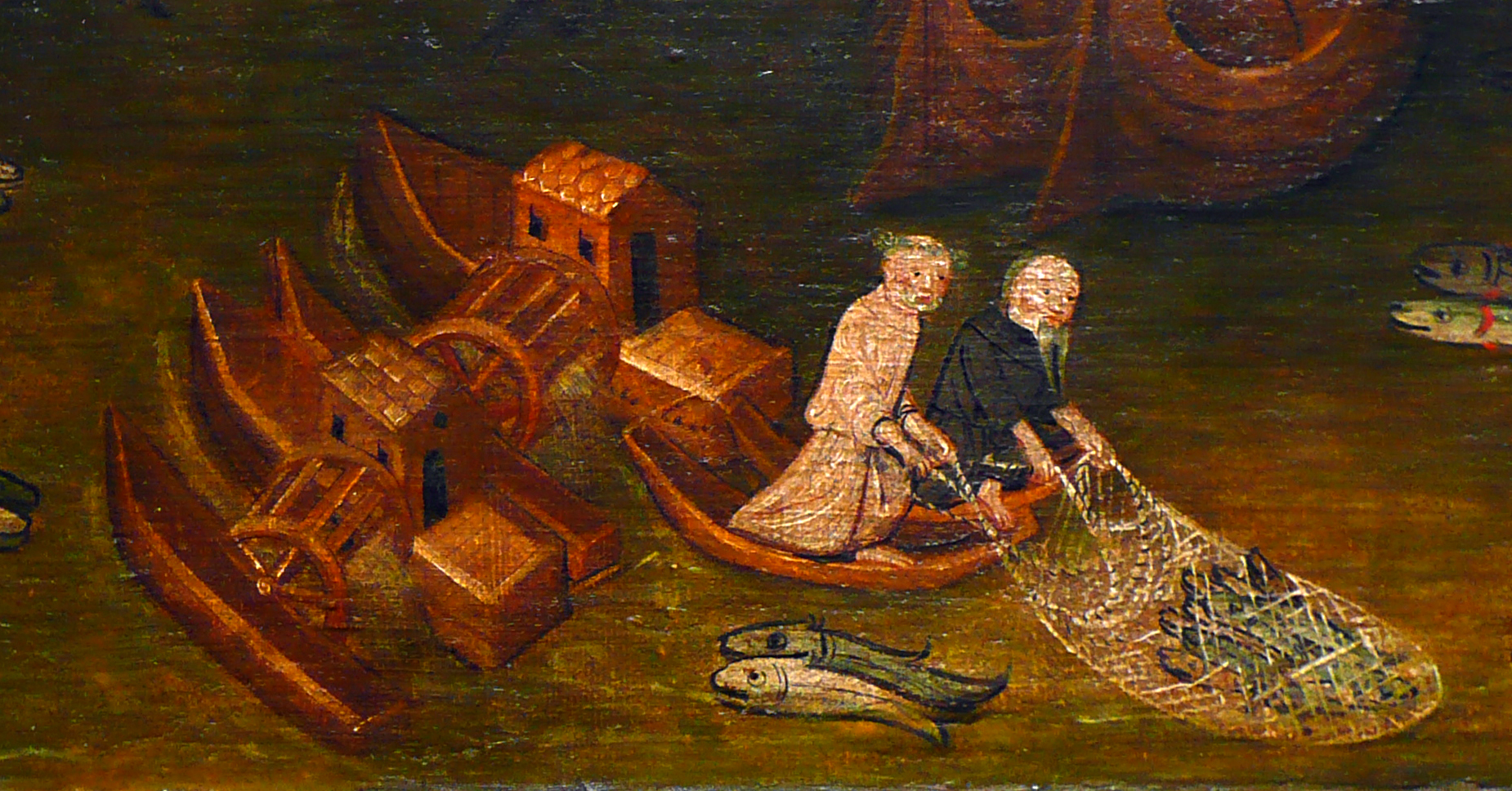
German ship mills on the Rhine at Cologne, around 1411.

Largely unaffected from the turbulent political events following the demise of the Western Roman Empire, the importance of watermilling continued to grow under the new Germanic lords. The sharp rise in numbers of early medieval watermills coincided with the appearance of new documentary genres (legal codes, monastic charters, hagiography) which were more inclined to address such a relatively mundane device than the ancient urban-centered literary class had been. This partly explains the relative abundance of medieval literary references to watermills compared to former times.

The quantitative growth of medieval evidence appears to be more than a mere reflection of the changing nature of surviving sources. By Carolingian times, references to watermills in the Frankish Realm had become "innumerable". At the time of the compilation of the Domesday Book (1086), there were an estimated 6,500 watermills in England alone.

By the early 7th century, watermills were well established in Ireland, and began to spread from the former territory of the empire into the non-romanized parts of Germany a century later. The introduction of the ship mill and tide mill in the 6th century, both of which yet unattested for the ancient period, allowed for a flexible response to the changing water-level of rivers and the Atlantic Ocean, thus demonstrating the technological innovativeness of early medieval watermillers.

== Earliest evidence ==
Below the earliest medieval evidence for different types of watermills. This list complements its ancient counterpart.

Date	Water-powered mill types	Find spot (or reference)	Location
537	Ship mill	Procop V (=Goth. I), 19.19–22	Rome
6th century	Sawmill; crank and connecting rod system without gear train	Gerasa and Ephesus	Jordan and Turkey
6th century	Vertical-wheeled tide mill	Killoteran near Waterford	Ireland
c. 630	Horizontal-wheeled tide mill	Little Island I	Ireland
c. 636	Horizontal-wheeled mill (Norse or Greek mill) (Note: Archaeology has unearthed in recent years increasingly more evidence for the existence of this wheel-type in the imperial Roman period.)	Ballykilleen	Ireland

== Written sources ==
In the following, literary, epigraphical and documentary sources referring to watermills and other water-driven machines are listed.

Reference	Location	Date	Type of evidence	Comments on
Annals of Ulster		650	Annal	
Benedict of Nursia, Regula 66.6–7		529/547		Possible watermill
Caesarius of Arles, Sermones, VIII, 4		Early 6th century		
Cassiodorus, Variae III, 31.2		510/511		
Charter of king Childebert I	Paris	556	Charter	Ship mill
Charter of king Dagobert II	Trier	646	Charter	
Charter of king Ethelbert of Kent		762	Charter	
Charter	Wang-Thulbach	754	Charter	Possible watermill
Charters	Lorsch Abbey	760s onwards	Charter	
Edictus Rothari 149–151		643	Legal code	
Gregorius Turonensis, Historia Francorum III, 19	Dijon	c. 575	Historiography	Ship mill
Gregorius Turonensis, Vitae Patrum, XVIII, 2		484/507	Hagiography	
Lex Alamannorum, 79–80		717/719	Legal code	
Lex Baivariorum, IX, 2		Probably 725/728	Legal code	
Lex Visigothorum, VII, 2.12 and VIII, 4.30		568/586	Legal code	
Marius Aventicius, Chronica	Geneva	563	Annal	Ship mill
"Muliheim"	Near Niederalteich	731	Charter	Likely watermill site
Nomos georgikós 81–82		Late 7th century	Legal code	
Pactus Alamannorum, V, 14		Early 7th century	Legal code	
Pactus legis Salicae, Recensio Guntchramna, X, 6; XII, 1–3; XXXI, 3		567/596	Legal code	
Procop V (=Goth. I), 19.19–22	Rome	537	Historiography	Ship mills
Senchus Mòr, De ceithri slichtaib Athgabála		c. 600	Legal code	
Venantius Fortunatus, Carmina, III, 12, 37–8		c. 600		
Vita Haimhrammi, 37	Thuringia	c. 770	Hagiography	Watermill (?) machinery
Vita Leobae, 12		c. 740	Hagiography	
Vita S. Orienti, II, 3		c. 380/420?	Hagiography	
Vita Sturmi, 20	Fulda	c. 765	Hagiography	Mill-channel
Vita S. Brigidae virginis, cols. 787–8 Migne		c. 650	Hagiography	
Vita S. Remigi episcopi Remensis, 17		486/511	Hagiography	

== Archaeological finds ==
=== Watermill sites ===
Below are listed excavated or surveyed watermill sites dated to the early medieval period.

Site	Country	Date	Identification/Remains
Ebbsfleet	England	Early 8th century	Horizontal-wheeled tide mill
Old Windsor I	England	Probably late 7th century	Mill-channel, woodwork of three vertical water-wheels
Old Windsor II	England	9th or 10th century	Mill-channel, horizontal-wheeled mill
Raunds, West Cotton	England	Late Saxon	Leat, sluice gate, chute, stake and wattle lined and stone surfaced wheel-pit
Tamworth	England	Between 846 and 864	Entire establishment
Dasing	Germany	696/697	Vertical-wheeled undershot or breastshot mill, mill-pond, mill-race, fragments of mill-stones
Ballykilleen	Ireland	c. 636	Horizontal-wheeled mill
Cloontycarthy	Ireland	c. 833	Entire establishment
Drumard	Ireland	c. 782	Horizontal-wheeled mill
Killoteran near Waterford	Ireland	6th century	Vertical-wheeled tide mill
Little Island I	Ireland	c. 630	Horizontal-wheeled tide mill
Little Island II	Ireland	7th century	Vertical-wheeled tide mill
Morett	Ireland	c. 710	Vertical-wheeled undershot mill
Gerasa	Jordan	6th century	Sawmill; crank and connecting rod system without gear train
Nendrum Monastery mill	Northern Ireland	619 & 789	Horizontal-wheeled tide mill
Ephesus	Turkey	6th century	Sawmill; crank and connecting rod system without gear train; multiple mill complex with at least five watermills

=== Millstones ===
The following list comprises stray finds of early medieval millstones. Note that there is no way to distinguish millstones driven by water-power from those powered by animals turning a capstan. Most, however, are assumed to derive from watermills.

Site	Country	Date (or find context)	Remains
Stroud	England	Probably Anglo-Saxon	Mill-paddles from horizontal wheel
Moycraig	Ireland	9th century	Horizontal paddle-wheel, hub and shaft, complete with pebble bearing

== Sources ==
- Czysz, Wolfgang (1994), "Eine bajuwarische Wassermühle im Paartal bei Dasing", Antike Welt, vol. 25, no. 2, pp. 152–154
- Holt, Richard (1988), The Mills of Medieval England, Oxford: Blackwell Publishers, ISBN 978-0-631-15692-5
- Kessener, Paul (2010), "Stone Sawing Machines of Roman and Early Byzantine Times in the Anatolian Mediterranean", Adalya, vol. 13, pp. 283–303, ISSN 1301-2746
- Mangartz, Fritz (2010), Die byzantinische Steinsäge von Ephesos. Baubefund, Rekonstruktion, Architekturteile, Monographien des Römisch-Germanischen Zentralmuseums, vol. 86, Mainz: Römisch-Germanisches Zentralmuseum, ISBN 978-3-88467-149-8
- McErlean, Thomas; Crothers, Norman (2007), Harnessing the Tides: The Early Medieval Tide Mills at Nendrum Monastery, Strangford Lough, Belfast: Stationery Office Books, ISBN 978-0-337-08877-3
- Murphy, Donald (2005), Excavations of a Mill at Killoteran, Co. Waterford as Part of the N-25 Waterford By-Pass Project, Estuarine/ Alluvial Archaeology in Ireland. Towards Best Practice, University College Dublin and National Roads Authority
- Ritti, Tullia; Grewe, Klaus; Kessener, Paul (2007), "A Relief of a Water-powered Stone Saw Mill on a Sarcophagus at Hierapolis and its Implications", Journal of Roman Archaeology, vol. 20, pp. 138–163
- Rynne, Colin (2000), "Waterpower in Medieval Ireland", in Squatriti, Paolo (ed.), Working with Water in Medieval Europe, Technology and Change in History, vol. 3, Leiden: Brill, pp. 1–50, ISBN 90-04-10680-4
- Watts, Martin (2006), Watermills, Shire, ISBN 978-0-7478-0654-7
- Wikander, Örjan (1985), "Archaeological Evidence for Early Water-Mills. An Interim Report", History of Technology, vol. 10, pp. 151–179
- Wikander, Örjan (2000), "The Water-Mill", in Wikander, Örjan (ed.), Handbook of Ancient Water Technology, Technology and Change in History, vol. 2, Leiden: Brill, pp. 371–400, ISBN 90-04-11123-9
- Wikander, Örjan (2014), "Early Water-mills East of the Rhine", in Karlsson, Lars; Carlsson, Susanne; Kullberg, Jesper (eds.), ΛΑΒΡΥΣ. Studies presented to Pontus Hellström, Boreas. Uppsala Studies in Ancient Mediterranean and Near Eastern Civilizations, vol. 35, Uppsala: Uppsala Universitet, pp. 205–219, ISBN 978-91-554-8831-4
- Wilson, Andrew (2002), "Machines, Power and the Ancient Economy", The Journal of Roman Studies, vol. 92, The Journal of Roman Studies, Vol. 92, pp. 1–32, doi:10.2307/3184857, JSTOR 3184857, S2CID 154629776

== See also ==
- List of tide mills on Long Island
