= Örjan Wikander =

Swedish classical archaeologist and ancient historian

- Born: 6 July 1943; Helsingborg, Sweden
- Education: Lund University
- Scientific career
- Fields: Classical archaeology, ancient history
- Workplaces: Lund University

Örjan Wikander (born 6 July 1943) is a Swedish classical archaeologist and ancient historian. His main interests are ancient water technology, ancient roof terracottas, Roman social history, Etruscan archaeology and epigraphy.

== Life ==
From 1963, Wikander studied Classical Archaeology and Ancient History, History, History of Art, and Classical Languages at Lund University. He received his BA in 1967 and PhD in 1980, both at Lund.

From 1979 to 1981, Wikander worked as a curator at the Greek and Roman department of the Medelhavsmuseet (Mediterranean Museum) in Stockholm. From 1981, he has been on the staff of the Department of Classics and the Department of Archaeology at the University of Lund. From 1985 to 1991, he held the position as researcher in ancient technology at the Swedish Research Council of Humanities. He was appointed professor at Lund University in 2001 and retired in 2008.

Wikander took part in the Swedish excavations at Acquarossa, Etruria in 1968–1975, 1978 and 1991. For shorter periods, he excavated at Uppåkra, Sweden (1968), Val Beretta, Etruria (1972, 1974), and in the Baths of Caracalla, Rome (1980).

As of 2011, Wikander has published five books and more than 120 scholarly and popular articles and reviews. He has been the editor or co-editor of four conference acta and handbooks.

== Work ==
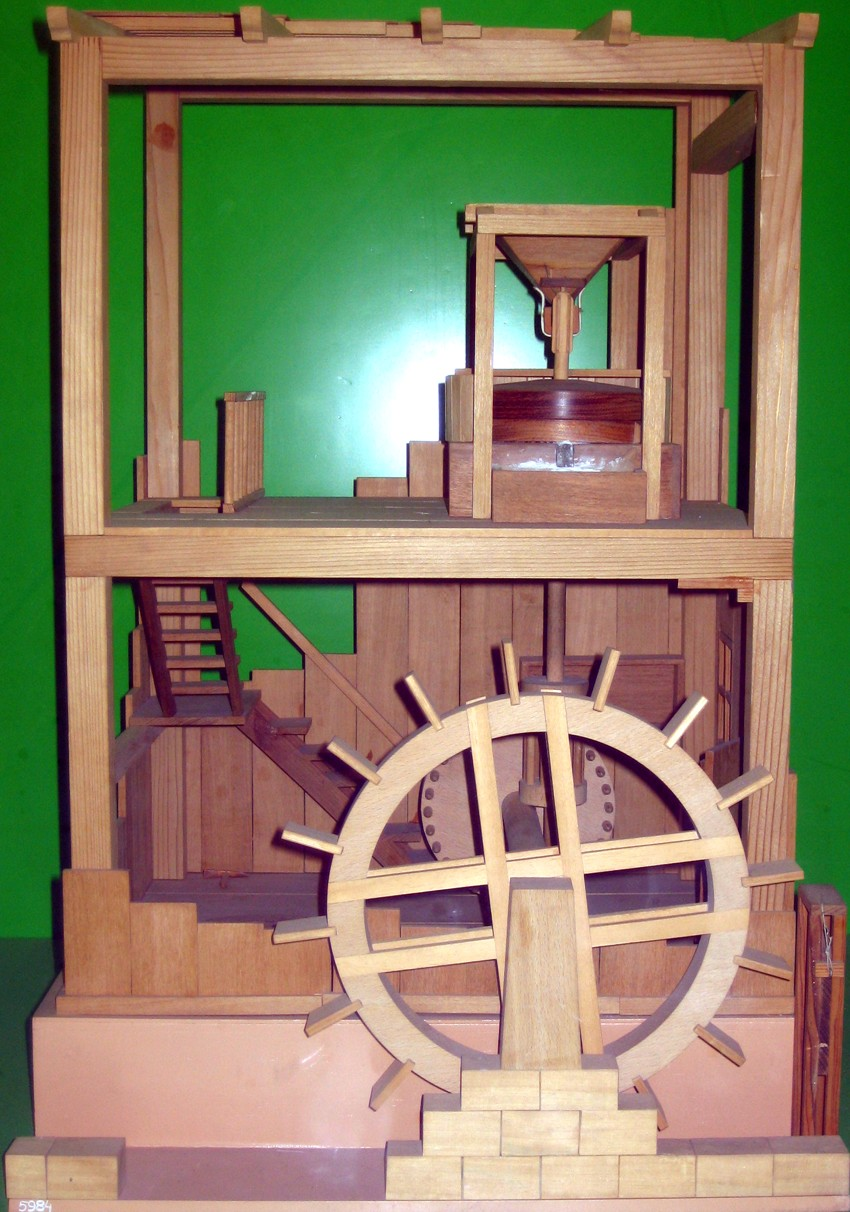
Roman watermill (modern model)

Wikander, basing his argument on the constantly increasing archaeological evidence for ancient watermills, makes a case for the breakthrough of watermilling occurring much earlier than previously thought, possibly already in the first century A.D. The wide distribution of watermill sites indicates that this labour-saving technology was adopted throughout the empire and must have had a significant impact on the late Roman economy. The relative lack of ancient written evidence compared to the medieval period is rather due to the general urban focus of ancient authors, while the watermill was primarily a rural phenomenon.

Wikander's studies of ancient architectural terracottas are focused around the development of tiled roofs in Archaic Etruria. By detailed publications of the entire tile material from some of the most important sites (Acquarossa, San Giovenale, Poggio Civitate), he has been able to present a general systematization of the early typological development in the area, together with a description of its basic technological prerequisites. He is also working on the publication of parts of the monumental zone at Acquarossa.

Wikander's prosopographical studies of senators and equites aim at a better understanding of the connections – economic and other – between the two leading classes of the Roman Republic. His basic hypothesis is that these contacts, often confirmed by marriage alliances, were far closer than generally acknowledged.

Together with his late wife Charlotte, Wikander has put in order the notes and documents concerning Etruscan inscriptions assembled by Olof August Danielsson during his preparations for the Corpus Inscriptionum Etruscarum (CIE) between 1886 and 1933. One substantial result of this work has been the publication of addenda and corrigenda to CIE II,1,4.

== Selected publications ==
- Caius Hostilius Mancinus and the Foedus Numantium, Opuscula Romana, Vol. 11, 1976, pp. 85–104
- Vattenmöllor och möllare i det romerska riket, Lund 1980 (diss.)
- Architectural Terracottas from San Giovenale, Opuscula Romana, Vol. 13, 1981, pp. 69–89
- Two Etruscan Thymiataria in the Vom Beskow Collection, Medelhavsmuseet Bulletin, Vol. 18, 1983, pp. 45–67
- Exploitation of Water-power or Technological Stagnation? A Reappraisal of the Productive Forces in the Roman Empire, Scripta Minora Regiae Societatis Humaniorum Litterarum Lundensis, No. 3, 1983–1984, ISBN 978-91-40-05072-4
- Senators and Equites I–VIII, Opuscula Romana, Vols. 15–26, 1985–2001
- Acquarossa VI, The Roof-tiles. Part 1: Catalogue and Architectural Context; Part 2: Typology and Technical Features, Skrifter utgivna av Svenska Institutet i Rom, 4º, 38.6,1–2, Stockholm 1986, 1993, ISBN 91-7042-116-1
- Handbook of Ancient Water Technology, Technology and Change in History, Vol. 2, Leiden: Brill, 2000, pp. ix–xi, 371–410, 607–630, 649–660, 703–741 (editor and author), ISBN 90-04-11123-9
- Etruscan Inscriptions from the Collections of Olof August Danielsson, Medelhavsmuseet Memoir, Vol. 10, Stockholm: Almqvist & Wiksell, 2003 (co-author with Charlotte Wikander), ISBN 978-91-89242-10-4
- Sources of Energy and Exploitation of Power, in Oleson, John Peter (ed.), Handbook of Engineering and Technology in the Classical World, Oxford: Oxford University Press, 2008, pp. 136–157, ISBN 978-0-19-518731-1
- Gadgets and Scientific Instruments, in Oleson, John Peter (ed.), Handbook of Engineering and Technology in the Classical World, Oxford: Oxford University Press, 2008, pp. 785–799, ISBN 978-0-19-518731-1

== See also ==
- List of ancient watermills
