= Barbegal aqueduct and mills =

Roman watermill complex in France

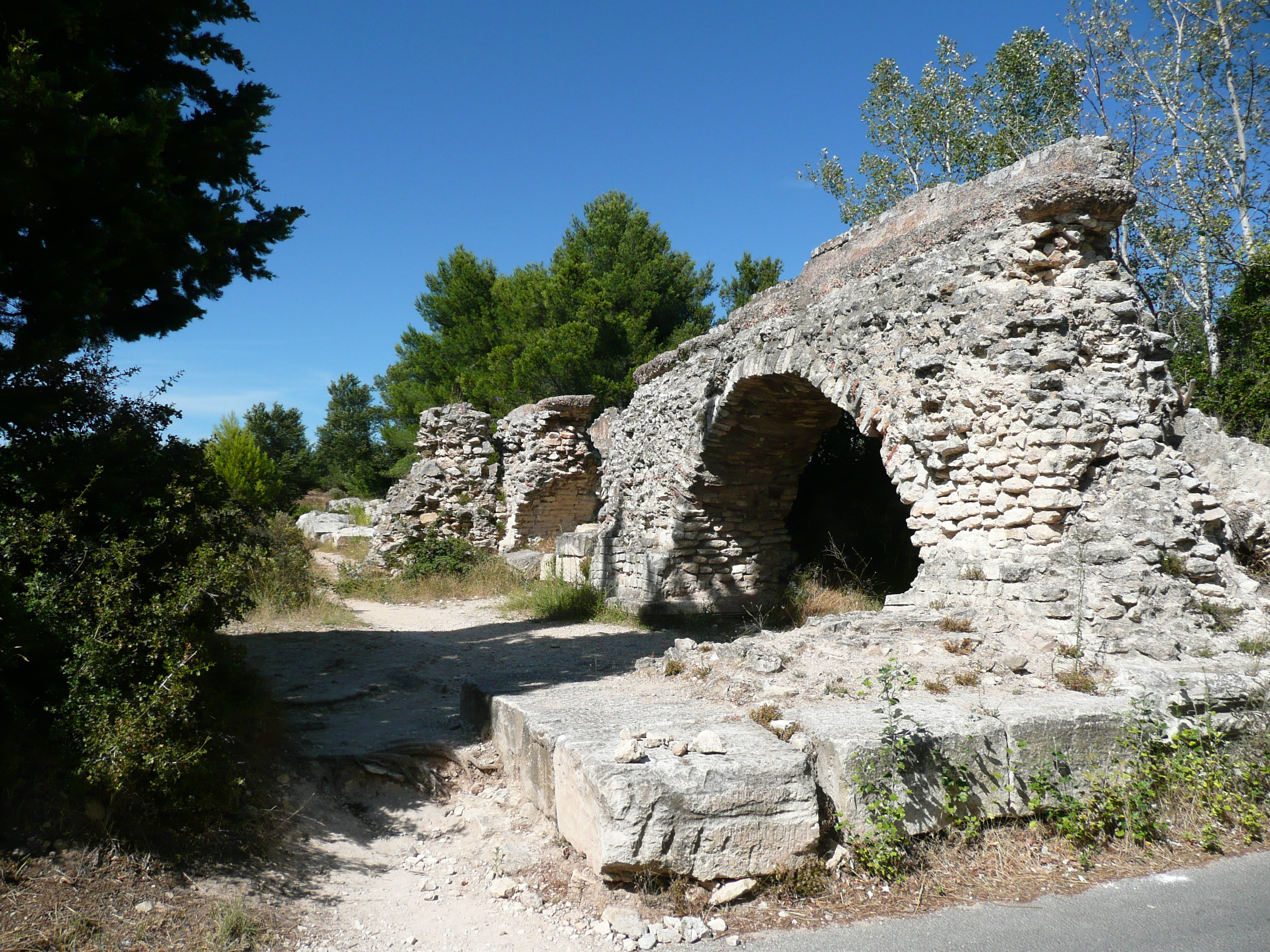
- The aqueduct
- Interactive map of Barbegal aqueduct and mills
- 43°42′09″N 4°43′17″E
- Location: Fontvieille, Bouches-du-Rhône, France

The Barbegal aqueduct and mills was a Roman watermill complex in the commune of Fontvieille, Bouches-du-Rhône, near the town of Arles, in southern France. The complex has been referred to as "the greatest known concentration of mechanical power in the ancient world" and the 16 overshot wheels are considered to be the largest ancient mill complex.

Another similar mill complex existed on the Janiculum in Rome, and there are suggestions that further such complexes existed at other major Roman sites, such as Amida (Mesopotamia).

== Description ==
The Barbegal site is located 12 kilometres east northeast of Arles near Fontvieille, where the Arles aqueduct passed near a steep escarpment. The mills consisted of 16 water wheels in two parallel sets of eight descending a steep hillside. There are substantial masonry remains of the water channels and foundations of the individual mills, together with a staircase rising up the hill upon which the mills were built. The mills operated from the beginning of the 2nd century until about the end of the 3rd century. The capacity of the mills has been estimated at 4.5 tonnes of flour per day, with some estimates stating up to 25 tonnes of capacity, enough to supply bread for as many as 10,000 or perhaps even 30,000–40,000 inhabitants of Arelate at that time. It is thought that the wheels were overshot water wheels with the outflows driving successive wheels to the base of the hill.

The Roman aqueducts that fed the mills were also built to supply water to the town of Arles (then called Arelate). The two aqueducts joined just north of the mill complex and a sluice controlled the water supply to the complex.

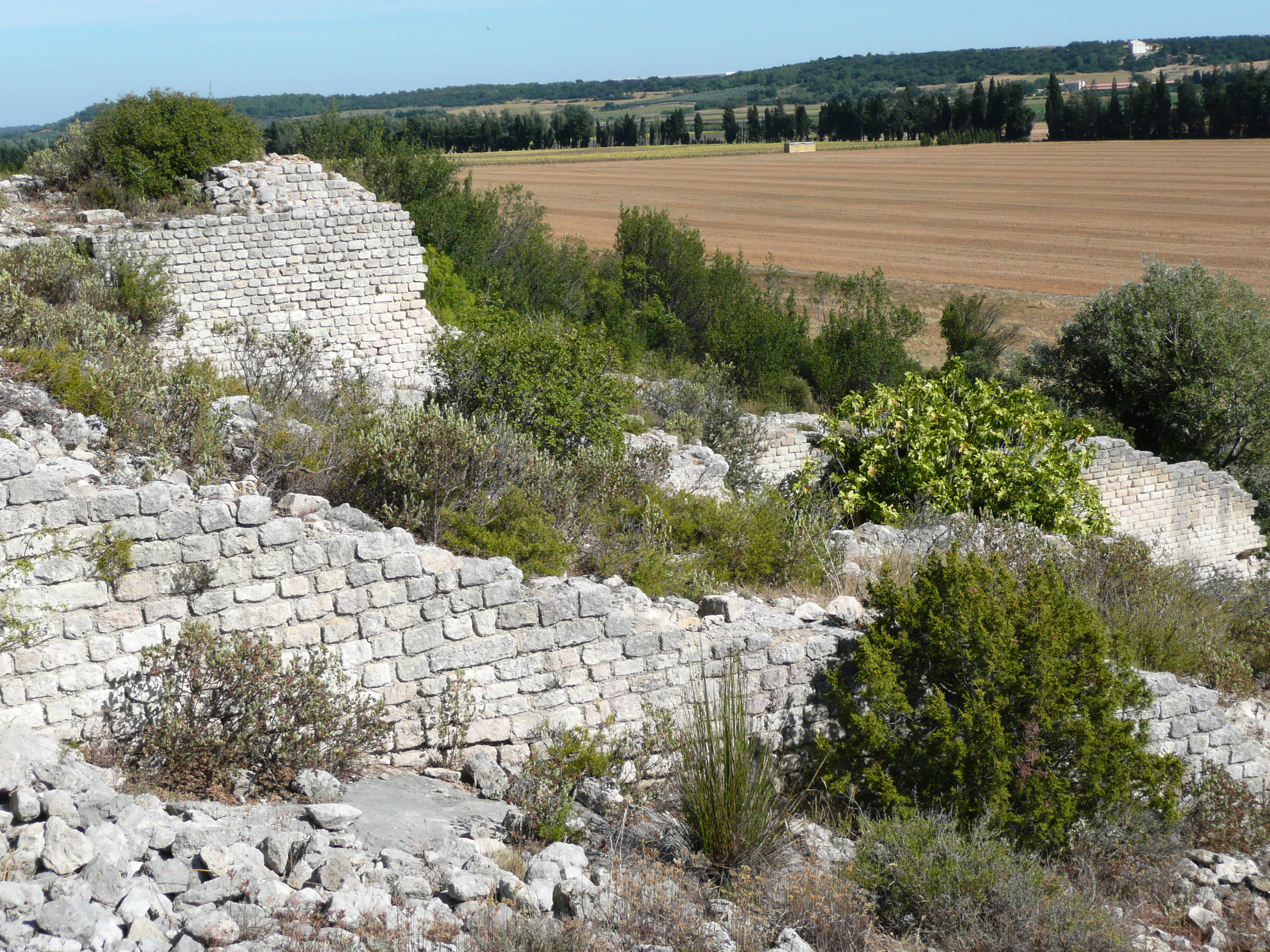
Mill

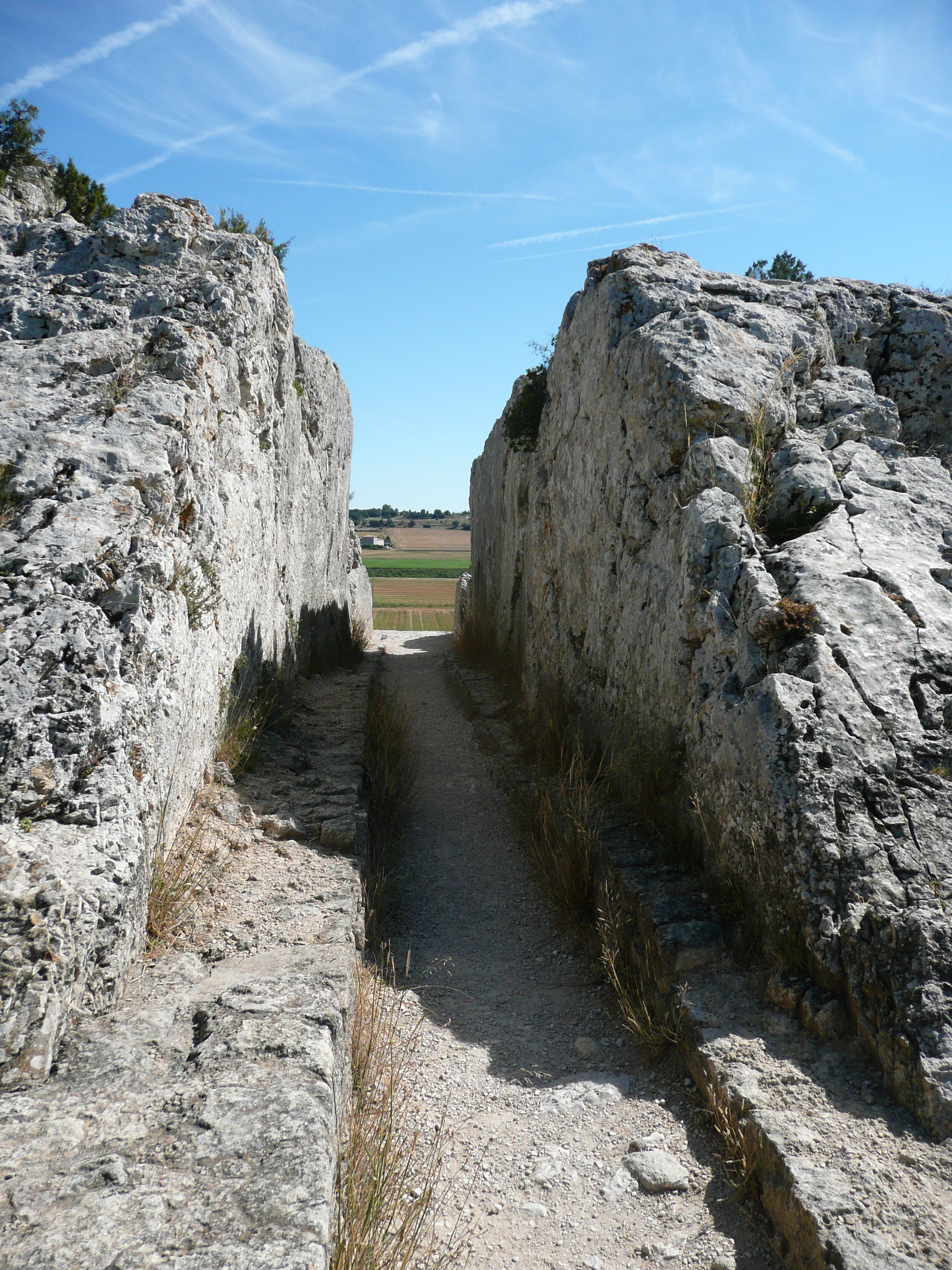
Aqueduct

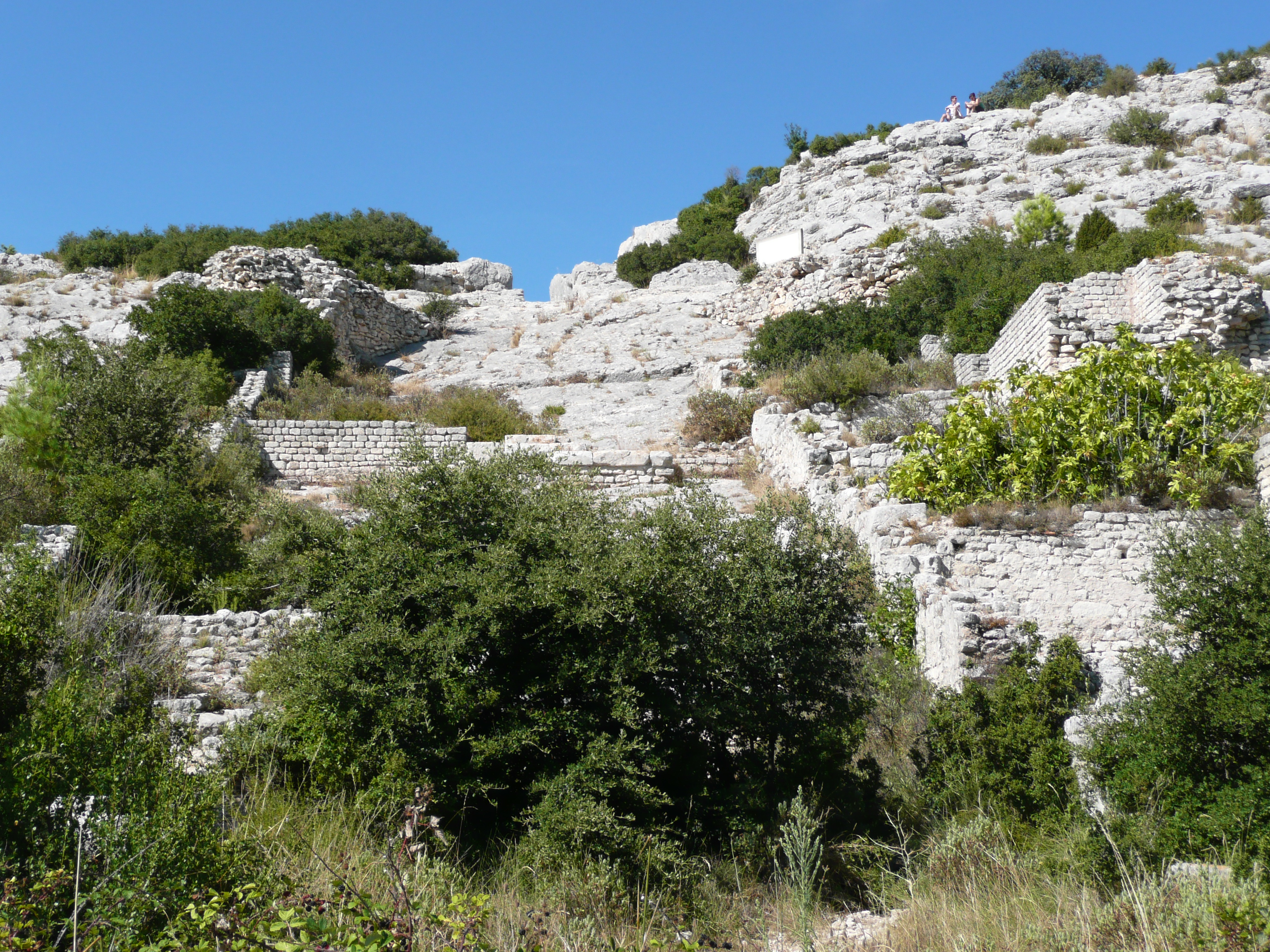
Remains of the complex

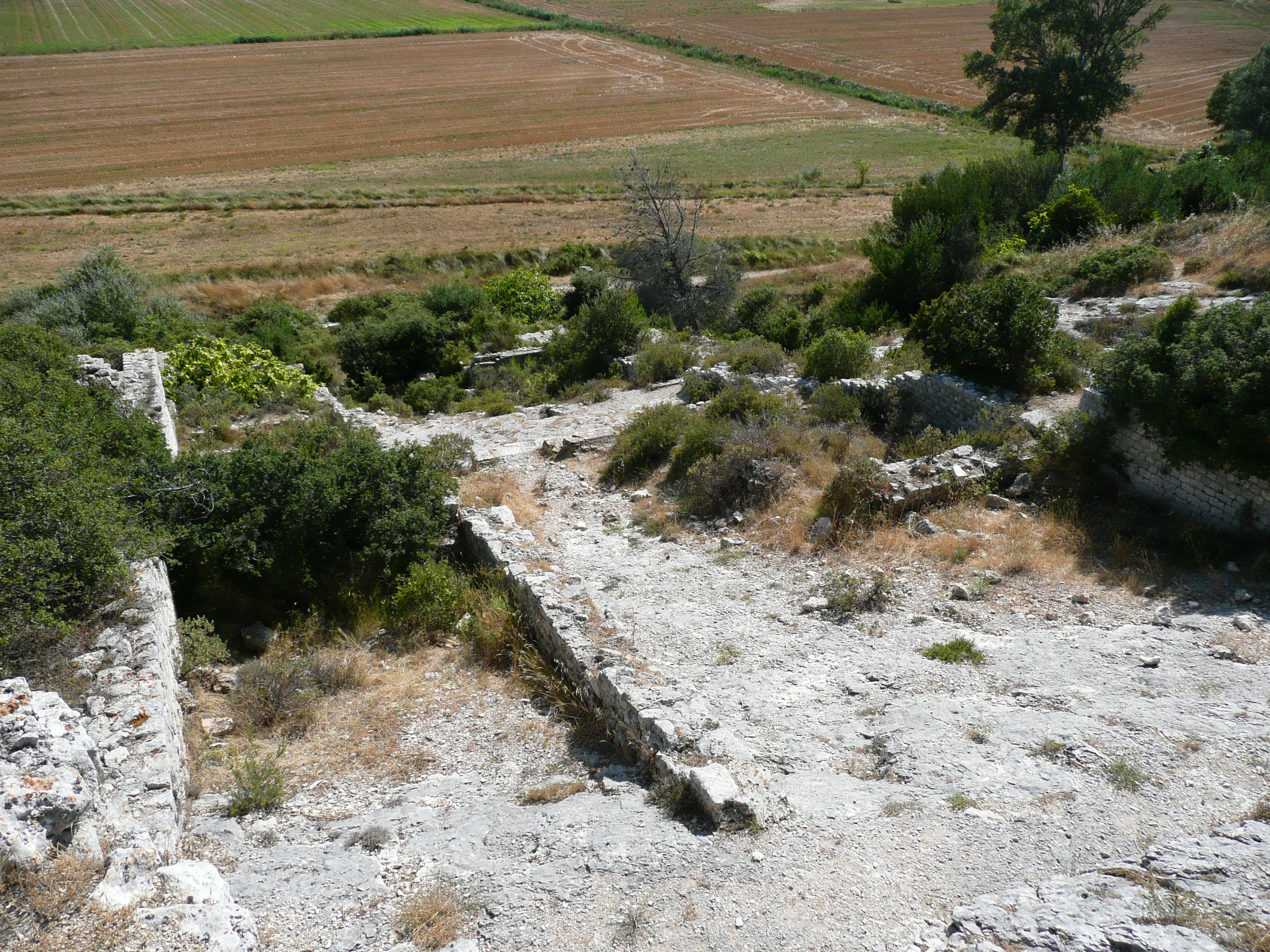
The sixteen overshot wheels

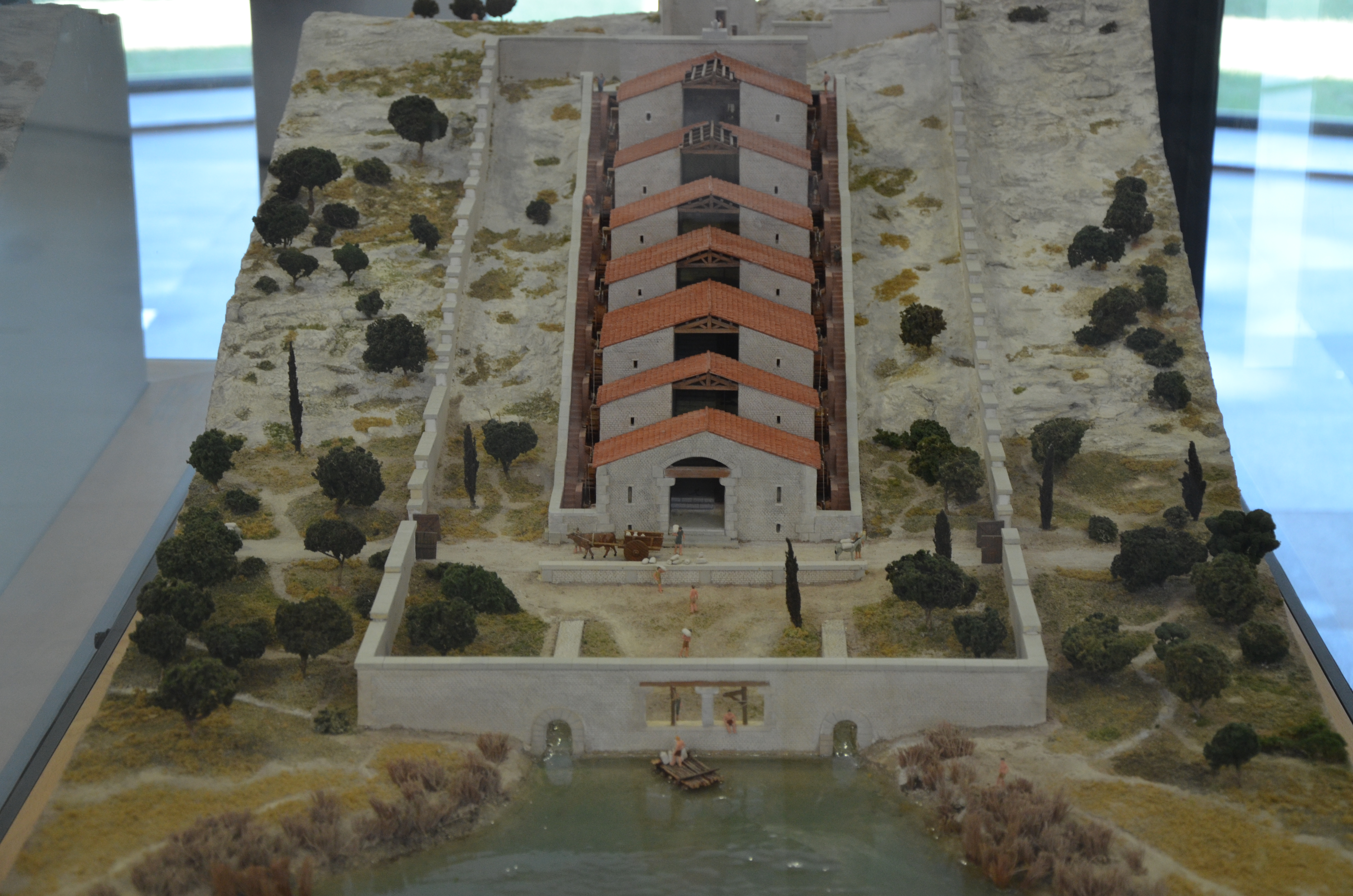
Model of the water mills at Barbegal in Musée de l'Arles antique

== Other mills ==
Vertical water mills were well known to the Romans, being described by Vitruvius in his De architectura of 25 BC, and mentioned by Pliny the Elder in his Naturalis Historiæ of 77 AD. There are also later references to floating water mills from Byzantium and to sawmills on the river Moselle by the poet Ausonius. The use of multiple stacked sequences of reverse overshot water wheels was widespread in Roman mines, especially in Spain and Wales. It is possible that the mills at Barbegal may also have been used for sawing timber and stone when not grinding wheat. The Hierapolis sawmill from the 3rd century AD shows a crank-activated frame saw being used in this way, and another has been excavated at Ephesus.

== Visiting the site ==
Visitors to Barbegal may park where a minor road (Route de L'Aqueduc) crosses the massive remains of the original aqueduct, and, with olive orchards on either side, walk south about 250 meters along the partially erect remains of the aqueduct and through the three meter deep rock-hewn cleft emerging at the top of the mill complex. Extensive farmland comes into view and spans 180° of the horizon to the south. The site is signposted as "Roman aqueduct" rather than as a mill. The Arles Museum of Antiquity has an informative reconstructed model of the mill. The site was slightly overgrown in spring 2022; care should be taken approaching and exploring the ruins.

== Influence ==
The English science historian James Burke examines Roman watermill technology such as that of the Barbegal aqueduct and mill, concluding that it influenced the Cistercians and their waterpower, which in turn influenced the Industrial Revolution, in the fourth of his ten-part Connections, called "Faith in Numbers".

== See also ==
- List of Roman watermills
- Roman technology
- Roman engineering
