= List of ancient watermills =

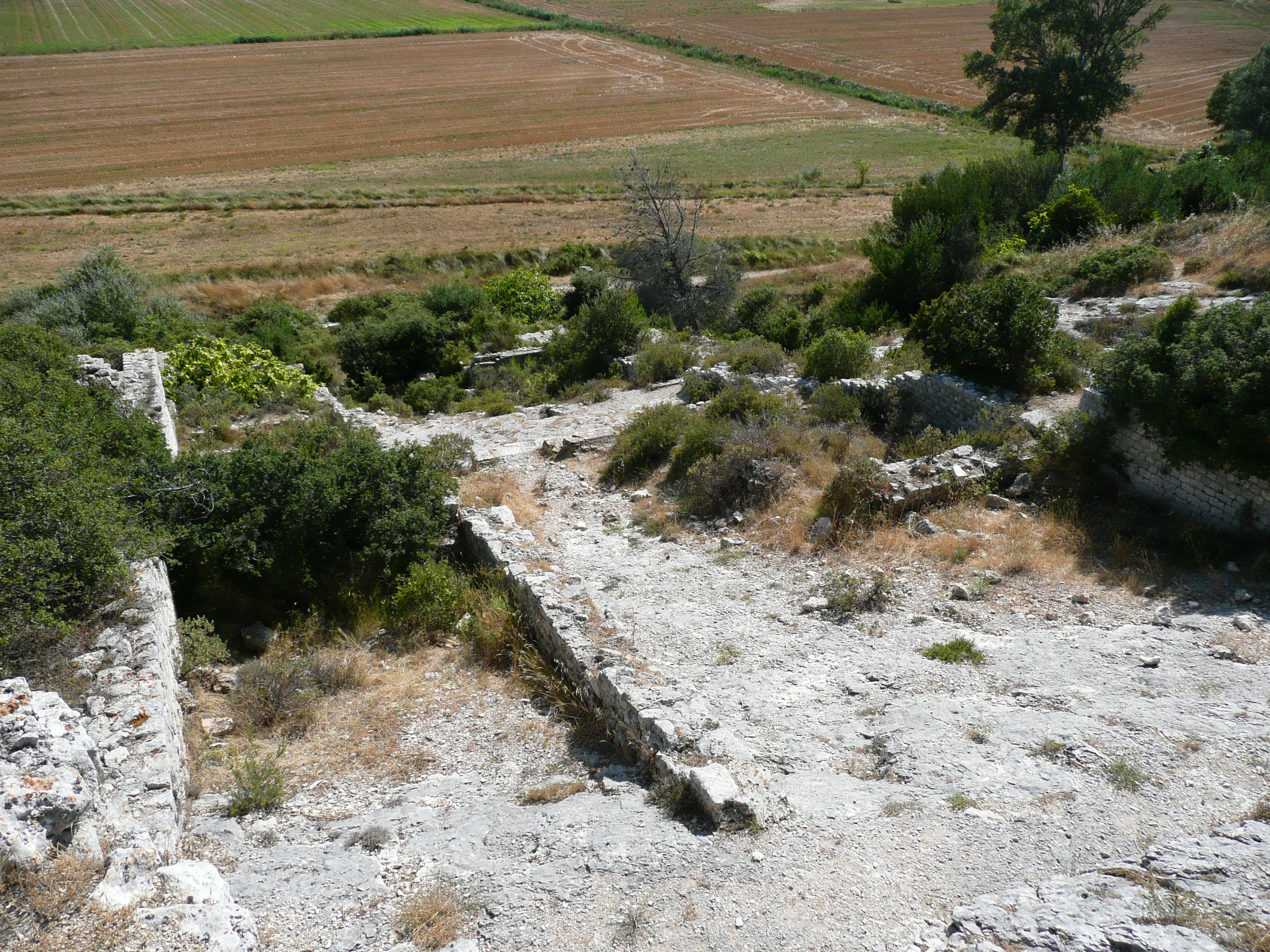
The Barbegal mill, located on a steep slope in southern France, is considered the biggest ancient mill complex. Its capacity was sufficient to feed the whole nearby city of Arles.

Scheme of a water-driven Roman sawmill at Hierapolis, Roman Asia. The 3rd century mill is the earliest known machine to incorporate a crank and connecting rod mechanism.

This list of ancient watermills presents an overview of water-powered grain-mills and industrial mills in the classical antiquity from their Hellenistic beginnings through the Roman imperial period.

== Historical overview ==
The watermill is the earliest instance of a machine harnessing natural forces to replace human muscular labour (apart from the sail). As such it holds a special place in the history of technology and also in economic studies where it is associated with growth.

The initial invention of the watermill appears to have occurred in the hellenized eastern Mediterranean in the wake of the conquests of Alexander the Great and the rise of Hellenistic science and technology. In the subsequent Roman era, the use of water-power was diversified and different types of watermills were introduced. These include all three variants of the vertical water wheel as well as the horizontal water wheel. Apart from its main use in grinding flour, water-power was also applied to pounding grain, crushing ore, sawing stones and possibly fulling and bellows for iron furnaces.

An increased research interest has greatly improved our knowledge of Roman watermill sites in recent years. Numerous archaeological finds in the western half of the empire now complement the surviving documentary material from the eastern provinces; they demonstrate that the breakthrough of watermill technology occurred as early as the 1st century AD and was not delayed until the onset of the Middle Ages as previously thought. The data shows a wide spread of grain-mills over most parts of the empire, with industrial mills also being in evidence in both halves. Although the prevalence of grain-mills naturally meant that watermilling remained primarily a rural phenomenon, it began gaining importance in urban environments .

The data below spans the period until c. 500 AD. The vast majority are dated to Roman times.

== Earliest evidence ==
Below the earliest ancient evidence for different types of watermills and the use of water-power for various industrial processes. This list is continued for the early Middle Ages here.

Date	Water-powered mill types	Reference (or find spot)	Modern Country
Possibly first half of 3rd century BC	Horizontal-wheeled mill	Byzantium (hypothesized place of invention)	Turkey
Possibly c. 240 BC	Vertical-wheeled mill	Alexandria (hypothesized place of invention)	Egypt
Before 71 BC?	Grain-mill ("watermill")	Strabon, XII, 3, 30 C 556	Turkey
40/10 BC	Undershot wheel mill	Vitruvius, X, 5.2	Unspecified
40/10 BC	Possible kneading machine	Vitruvius, X, 5.2	Unspecified
20 BC/10 AD	Overshot wheel mill	Antipater of Thessalonica, IX, 418.4–6	Unspecified
c. 70 AD	Trip hammer	Pliny, Naturalis Historia, XVIII, 23.97	Italy
73/4 AD	Possible fulling mill	Antioch	Syria
2nd century AD	Multiple mill complex	Barbegal mill	France
Late 2nd century AD	Breastshot wheel mill	Les Martres-de-Veyre	France
Second half of 3rd century AD	Sawmill; crank and connecting rod system with gear train	Hierapolis sarcophagus	Turkey
Late 3rd or early 4th century AD	Turbine mill	Chemtou and Testour	Tunisia
Late 3rd or early 4th century AD	Possible tanning mill	Saepinum	Italy
?	Possible furnace	Marseille	France

Undershot water wheel

Breastshot water wheel

Overshot water wheel

== Written sources ==
In the following, literary, epigraphical and documentary sources referring to watermills and other water-driven machines are listed.

Reference	Location	Date	Type of evidence	Comments on
Ammianus Marcellinus, 18.8.11	Amida	359 AD	History	Multiple mill complex
Antipater of Thessalonica, IX, 418.4–6	Unspecified	20 BC/10 AD	Poem	Earliest reference to overshot wheel mill
Ausonius, Mosella, 362–364	Ruwer river	c. 370 AD	Poem	Water-powered marble saws and grain-mills
Beroea	Macedonia	2nd century AD	Decree	Tax revenue from watermills
Cedrenus, Historiarum compendium, p. 295 [516]	India	c. 325 AD	History	
CG-CI, pp. 86–90, no. 41	Corinth	6th century AD		
CIL, III, 5866	Günzburg	1st/3rd century AD	Epigraphy	Miller’s guild
CIL, III, 14969, 2	Promona	1st/4th century AD	Epigraphy	
CIL, VI, 1711		c. 480 AD	Epigraphy	
Codex Justinianus, XI, 43, 10, 3	Constantinople	474/491 AD	Legal code	
Codex Theodosianus, XIV, 15.4		398 AD	Legal code	
Diocletian, XV, 54		301 AD	Price edict	
Euchromius, VII, pp. 138–9, no. 169	Sardis	4th to 5th/6th century AD	Epigraphy	Watermill engineer
Gregory of Nyssa, In Ecclesiasten, III, 656A Migne		c. 370/390 AD	Theology	Water-powered marble saws?
John Cassian, Conlationes Patrum, I, 18		426 AD?	Theology	
Letter	Egypt	5th century AD		Possible watermill
Libanius, Or. 4.29	Antioch	380s AD	Rhetoric	Tax on watermills
MAMA, VII, p. 70, no. 305, lines 29–32	Orcistus	c. 329 AD	Epigraphy	Town privilege
Mar. Aur. Apollodotos Kalliklianos	Hierapolis	Second half of 3rd century AD	Epigraphy	Member of guild of water-millers
Molitor	Châteauneuf	1st century AD	Epigraphy	
Palladius, Opus agriculturae, I, 41, (42)		4th/5th century AD	Treatise	Use of waste water to drive watermills
Pliny, Naturalis Historia, XVIII, 23.97	Italy	c. 70 AD	Encyclopedia	Water-powered pestles
Sabinianus I, 18		c. 450 AD	Hagiography	
Strabon, XII, 3, 30 C 556	Cabira	Before 71 BC?	Geography	
Talmud, Shabbat, I, 5		Before 70 AD?		
Two inscriptions	Antioch	73/4 AD	Epigraphy	Possibly fulling mills
Visigothic Code, VII, 2, 12 and VIII, 4, 29–30		Late 5th century AD	Legal code	
Vita S. Romani abbatis, 17–18		c. 450 AD	Hagiography	Water-powered pestles
Vitruvius, X, 5.2		40/10 BC	Engineering	Earliest description of undershot wheel mill
Vitruvius, X, 5.2		40/10 BC	Engineering	Possible kneading machine

== Graphical representations ==
This section deals with depictions of watermills which are preserved in ancient paintings, reliefs, mosaics, etc.

Place (or object)	Country	Date	Type of evidence	Identification/Remains
Coemeterium Maius at Rome	Italy	Late 3rd century AD?	Wall painting	
Utica	Tunisia	4th century AD	Mosaic (Note: Character as watermill disputed (Wilson 1995, p. 375))	
Great Palace of Constantinople	Turkey	c. 450/500 AD	Mosaic	One probable and one possible representation
Hierapolis sarcophagus	Turkey	Second half of 3rd century AD	Relief	Water-powered stone sawmill; earliest known crank and connecting rod system

== Archaeological finds ==
=== Watermill sites ===
Below are listed excavated or surveyed watermill sites dated to the ancient period.

Site	Country	Date	Identification/Remains
Mouzaïa des Mines, near	Algeria	Unspecified	Unspecified remains
Oued Bou Ardoun	Algeria	Possibly 2nd to 3rd century AD	Unspecified remains
Oued Bou Ya'koub	Algeria	Unspecified	Drop-tower mill
Oued Mellah	Algeria	Possibly 4th century AD	Drop-tower mill
Ardleigh, Spring Valley Mill	England	Unspecified	Possible Roman watermill site including millstones
Chesters	England	Possibly 3rd century AD	Mill-race, mill-chamber, tail-race, millstones
Fullerton	England	Unspecified	Two watermills
Haltwhistle Burn Head	England	225–70 AD	Entire establishment
Ickham I	England	150–280 AD	Mill-race, mill-building, fragments of millstones
Ickham II	England	3rd and 4th centuries AD	Mill-race, sluice-gate, mill-building, fragments of millstones
Nettleton	England	230 AD	Mill-race, sluice-gate, wheel-pit, tail-race
Wherwell	England	Late 3rd or early 4th century AD	Mill-channel, mill-building (?), fragments of millstones
Willowford	England	Late 2nd or 3rd century AD?	Water-channels, sluices (?), fragments of millstones
Barbegal mill	France	2nd century AD	Multiple mill complex with sixteen overshot wheels on two mill-races, fed by aqueduct
Fontvieille, Calade du Castellet	France	5th/6th century AD	Horizontal-wheeled mill
Gannes	France	Presumably 4th or 5th century AD	Horizontal (?) water-wheel
La Crau	France	2nd century AD	Vertical-wheeled mill
La Garde (Var)	France	Unspecified	Vertical-wheeled mill
Lattes	France	Unspecified	Unspecified
Le Cannet-des-Maures	France	5th century AD	Two horizontal-wheeled mills
Les Arcs (Var)	France	2nd/3rd century AD	Vertical-wheeled mill
Les Martres-de-Veyre I	France	1st century AD	Unspecified remains
Les Martres-de-Veyre II	France	Late 2nd century AD	Entire establishment; breastshot wheel
Lyon-Vaise	France	Late 1st century AD abandoned	Millstones, mill-chamber timbers
Paulhan I–III	France	40/50–early 3rd century AD	Three consecutive mills
Pézenas	France	2nd century AD	Horizontal-wheeled mill
Taradeau	France	Late 2nd–4th century AD	Horizontal-wheeled mill
Bobingen	Germany	117/138 AD	Posts, boards, mill-race
Inden	Germany	End of 1st century BC	Millstones, wheel-shaft bearings, paddle fragments
Lösnich I	Germany	2nd/4th century AD?	Mill-race, wheel-pit, fragment of a millstone
Lösnich II	Germany	2nd/4th century AD?	Mill-race
Munich-Perlach	Germany	End of 2nd century AD	Mill-chamber, mill-race, millstone fragments; possibly duplex drive
Athens, Agora I	Greece	5th and 6th centuries AD	Aqueduct, wheel-pit, mill-chamber, tail-race
Athens, Agora II	Greece	460/75 to c.580 AD	Entire establishment
Athens, Agora III	Greece	Unspecified	Unspecified remains
El-Qabu	Israel	Possibly Roman	Unspecified remains
En Shoqeq	Israel	2nd century AD	Masonry dam with mills
Farod I–III	Israel	5th or 6th century AD	Three drop-tower mills
Farod IV–V	Israel	Unspecified	Two mills
Ma'agan Michael	Israel	3rd century AD?	Masonry dam, with eleven mills
Nahal Tanninim	Israel	Early 4th/mid-7th century AD	Six vertical-wheeled mills with duplex drives and underdriven Pompeian millstones
Wadi Fejjas I–III	Israel	Probably Roman	Three drop-tower mills
Wadi Serrar	Israel	Probably Roman	Unspecified remains
Yarkon	Israel	2nd century AD	Unspecified remains
Oderzo	Italy	2nd century AD	Mill-race
Rome, Baths of Caracalla I	Italy	Between 212/235 to mid-3rd century AD	Two vertical-wheeled mills
Rome, Baths of Caracalla II	Italy	Mid-3rd century to 5th century AD	Two vertical-wheeled mills
Rome, Janiculum	Italy	Early 3rd century AD	Aqueducts, reservoirs, sluices, millstones
Saepinum	Italy	Late 3rd or early 4th century AD	Aqueduct, sluice-gates, wheel-pit, tail-race. Recently identified as tanning mill.
San Giovanni di Ruoti	Italy	Early 1st century AD	Unspecified remains
Venafro	Italy	Possibly early Empire	Undershot water wheel, millstones
Gerasa	Jordan	6th century AD	Water-powered stone sawmill with two four-bladed saws; crank and connecting rod system without gear train
Wadi al-Hasa	Jordan	Probably late Roman	At least nineteen possible drop-tower mills
Oued es Soueïr	Morocco	Unspecified	Unspecified remains
Avenches	Switzerland	57/58–80 AD	Mill-race timbers
Rodersdorf, Klein Büel	Switzerland	1st century AD	Millstone, mill-race
Palmyra	Syria	Possibly Roman	Unspecified remains
Chemtou	Tunisia	Late 3rd or early 4th century AD	Triple helix turbine mill with horizontal wheels
Testour	Tunisia	Late 3rd or early 4th century AD	Triple helix turbine mill with horizontal wheels
Colossae	Turkey	Unspecified	Possible multiple-mill complex
Kurşunlu Waterfall, near Perge	Turkey	Unspecified	Unspecified remains
Lamus river	Turkey	Apparently late antique	Seven horizontal-wheeled mills

=== Millstones ===
The following list comprises stray finds of ancient millstones. Note that there is no way to distinguish millstones driven by water-power from those powered by animals turning a capstan. Most, however, are assumed to derive from watermills.

Site	Country	Date (or find context)	Remains
Barton Court Farm	England	4th century AD well	Fragments of four millstones
Chedworth	England	Roman villa	One lower stone, fragment of another
Chew Park	England	Late 3rd or early 4th century AD	One complete upper stone, part of another
Dicket Mead	England	Roman building	Fragments of millstones
Leeds	England	Roman pottery dated to 1st and 2nd centuries AD	Fragment of millstone
Littlecote Roman Villa	England	2nd century AD timber building	Fragment of millstone
London	England	1st-2nd century AD	Several millstones
London	England	Late 2nd century AD Roman ship	One unfinished millstone
Selsey	England	Unspecified	Fragment of millstone
Vindolanda	England	Possibly Roman	Four millstones
Wantage	England	On display in museum	Two millstones
Woolaston	England	c. 320 AD	Two upper millstones
La Chapelle-Taillefert	France	Pottery and coins from 2nd century AD	Pair of millstones
Lyon	France	On display in museum	Many unpublished millstones
Paris	France	On display in museum	Six millstones
Aalen	Germany	On display in museum	Five millstones
Cologne	Germany	On display in museum	Three millstones
Dasing	Germany	Unspecified	Fragments of millstones
Koblenz	Germany	On display in museum	Several millstones
Mayen	Germany	Quarry	Unfinished Roman millstones
Budapest	Hungary	On display in museum	Six millstones
Beit She'an	Israel	Late 4th or early 5th century AD	Upper millstone
Buqueiah	Israel	Allegedly from ancient watermill	Upper millstone
Bologna	Italy	On display in museum	Six millstones
Naples	Italy	Probably Roman	Several millstones
Palatine, Rome	Italy	4th or 5th century AD	47 millstones from at least five watermills
Apulum	Romania	2nd or 3rd century AD	Pair of millstones
Cluj-Napoca	Romania	2nd or 3rd century AD	Upper millstone
Micia	Romania	2nd or 3rd century AD	Pair of millstones
Caerwent	Wales	Smithy	Millstones
Whitton	Wales	Unspecified	Fragment of millstone

=== Water wheels and other components ===
Although more rare than the massive millstones, finds of wooden and iron parts of the mill machinery can also point to the existence of ancient watermills. Large stone mortars have been found at many mines; their deformations suggest automated crushing mills worked by water wheels.

Site	Country	Date (or find context)	Remains
Great Chesterford	England	Early 5th century AD hoard	Iron spindle with three winged rynds
Silchester	England	Mid-4th century AD hoard	Iron spindle
Saint-Doulchard	France	1/10 to c.50 AD	Paddles, mill-chamber posts
Conimbriga	Portugal	On display in museum, allegedly 1st century AD	Mill-wheel
Hagendorn	Switzerland	Late 2nd century AD	Three undershot wheels
Dolaucothi	Wales	1st and 2nd centuries AD	Stone anvil (Carreg Pumsaint) nearby

== Sources ==
Watermill lists which summarize the rapidly developing state of research are provided by Wikander 1985 and Brun 2006, with additions by Wilson 1995 and 2002. Spain 2008 undertakes a technical analysis of around thirty known ancient mill sites.

- Ad, Uzi; Saʿid, ʿAbd al-Salam; Frankel, Rafael (2005), "Water-mills with Pompeian-type Millstones at Nahal Tanninim", Israel Exploration Journal, vol. 55, no. 2, pp. 156–171
- Amouric, Henri; Thernot, Robert; Vacca-Goutouli, Mireille; Bruneton, Hélène (2000), "Un moulin à turbine de la fin de l'Antiquité. La Calade du Castellet (Fontvieille)", in Leveau, Philippe; Saquet, J. P. (eds.), Milieu et sociétés dans la Vallée des Baux. Études présentées au colloque de Mouriès, Revue Archéologique de Narbonnaise (Supplement), vol. 31, Montpellier: Association de la Revue Archéologique de Narbonnaise, pp. 261–274, ISBN 978-2-84269-369-5
- Brun, Jean-Pierre (2006), "L'energie hydraulique durant l'Empire romain: quel impact sur l'economie agricole?", in Lo Cascio, Elio (ed.), Innovazione tecnica e progresso economico nel mondo romano: atti degli Incontri capresi di storia dell'economia antica (Capri 13-16 Aprile 2003), Bari: Edipuglia, pp. 101–130, ISBN 978-88-7228-405-6
- Brun, Jean-Pierre; Borréani, Marc (1998), "Deux moulins hydrauliques du Haut-Empire romain en Narbonnaise: Villae des Mesclans à La Crau et de Saint-Pierre/Les Laurons aux Arcs (Var)", Gallia, vol. 55, pp. 279–326
- Brun, Jean-Pierre; Leguilloux, Martine Leguilloux (2014), "Les installations artisanales romaines de Saepinum. Tannerie et moulin hydraulique", Collection du Centre Jean Bérard 43, Archéologie de l’artisanat antique 7, Naples: Centre Jean Bérard, ISSN 1590-3869
- Burnham, Barry C. (1997), "Roman Mining at Dolaucothi: The Implications of the 1991–3 Excavations near the Carreg Pumsaint", Britannia, vol. 28, pp. 325–336, doi:10.2307/526771
- Champagne, Frédéric; Ferdière, Alain; Rialland, Yannick (1997), "Re-découverte d'un moulin à eau augustéen sur l'Yèvre (Cher)", Revue archéologique du Centre de la France, vol. 36, pp. 157–160
- Czysz, Wolfgang (1994), "Eine bajuwarische Wassermühle im Paartal bei Dasing", Antike Welt, vol. 25, no. 2, pp. 152–154
- Donners, K.; Waelkens, M.; Deckers, J. (2002), "Water Mills in the Area of Sagalassos: A Disappearing Ancient Technology", Anatolian Studies, vol. 52, pp. 1–17, doi:10.2307/3643076, JSTOR 3643076
- Geilenbrügge, Udo (2010), Älteste Wassermühle Mitteleuropas entdeckt (PDF), Archäologie in Deutschland, vol. 2010/1, Stuttgart: Theiss, p. 4, ISSN 0176-8522
- Geilenbrügge, Udo; Schürmann, Wilhelm (2010), "Die älteste Wassermühle Mitteleuropas im Indetal bei Altdorf?", in Kunow, Jürgen (ed.), Archäologie im Rheinland 2009, Archäologie im Rheinland, Stuttgart: Theiss, pp. 62–64, ISBN 978-3-8062-2383-5
- Greene, Kevin (2000), "Technological Innovation and Economic Progress in the Ancient World: M.I. Finley Re-Considered", The Economic History Review, vol. 53, no. 1, pp. 29–59, doi:10.1111/1468-0289.00151
- Ritti, Tullia; Grewe, Klaus; Kessener, Paul (2007), "A Relief of a Water-powered Stone Saw Mill on a Sarcophagus at Hierapolis and its Implications", Journal of Roman Archaeology, vol. 20, pp. 138–163
- Spain, Robert (2008), The Power and Performance of Roman Water-mills. Hydro-mechanical Analysis of Vertical-wheeled Water-mills, British Archaeological Reports. International Series, vol. 1786, Oxford: Archaeopress, ISBN 978-1-4073-0217-1
- Wikander, Örjan (1985), "Archaeological Evidence for Early Water-Mills. An Interim Report", History of Technology, vol. 10, pp. 151–179
- Wikander, Örjan (2000a), "The Water-Mill", in Wikander, Örjan (ed.), Handbook of Ancient Water Technology, Technology and Change in History, vol. 2, Leiden: Brill, pp. 371–400, ISBN 90-04-11123-9
- Wikander, Örjan (2000b), "Industrial Applications of Water-Power", in Wikander, Örjan (ed.), Handbook of Ancient Water Technology, Technology and Change in History, vol. 2, Leiden: Brill, pp. 401–410, ISBN 90-04-11123-9
- Wikander, Örjan (2014), "Early Water-mills East of the Rhine", in Karlsson, Lars; Carlsson, Susanne; Kullberg, Jesper (eds.), ΛΑΒΡΥΣ. Studies presented to Pontus Hellström, Boreas. Uppsala Studies in Ancient Mediterranean and Near Eastern Civilizations, vol. 35, Uppsala: Uppsala Universitet, pp. 205–219, ISBN 978-91-554-8831-4
- Wilson, Andrew (1995), "Water-Power in North Africa and the Development of the Horizontal Water-Wheel", Journal of Roman Archaeology, vol. 8, pp. 499–510
- Wilson, Andrew (2001), "Water-Mills at Amida: Ammianus Marcellinus 18.8.11" (PDF), The Classical Quarterly, vol. 51, no. 1, pp. 231–236, doi:10.1093/cq/51.1.231
- Wilson, Andrew (2002), "Machines, Power and the Ancient Economy", The Journal of Roman Studies, vol. 92, pp. 1–32, doi:10.2307/3184857, JSTOR 3184857
- Wilson, Andrew (2020), "Roman Water-Power. Chronological Trends and Geographical Spread", in Erdkamp, Paul; Verboven, Koenraad; Zuiderhoek, Arjan (eds.), Capital, Investment, and Innovation in the Roman World, Oxford University Press, pp. 147–194, ISBN 978-0-19-884184-5
