= Hierapolis sawmill =

Roman water-powered stone sawmill

Scheme of the water-driven sawmill at Hierapolis, Roman Asia. The 3rd-century mill is considered the earliest known machine to incorporate a crank and connecting rod.

The Hierapolis sawmill was a water-powered stone sawmill in the Ancient Greek city of Hierapolis in Roman Asia (modern-day Turkey). Dating to the second half of the 3rd century AD, the sawmill is considered the earliest known machine to combine a crank with a connecting rod to form a crank-slider mechanism.

The watermill is evidenced by a raised relief on the sarcophagus of a certain Marcus Aurelius Ammianos, a local miller. On the pediment a waterwheel fed by a mill race is shown powering via a gear train two frame saws cutting rectangular blocks by the way of connecting rods and, through mechanical necessity, cranks (see diagram). The accompanying inscription is in Greek and attributes the mechanism to Ammianos' "skills with wheels".

== Other sawmills ==
Further Roman crank and connecting rod mechanisms, without gear train, are archaeologically attested for the 6th century AD water-powered stone sawmills at Gerasa, Jordan, and Ephesus, Turkey. A fourth sawmill possibly existed at Augusta Raurica, Switzerland, where a metal crank from the 2nd century AD has been excavated.

Literary references to water-powered marble saws in Trier, Germany, can be found in Ausonius' late 4th century AD poem Mosella. About the same time, they also seem to be indicated by the Christian saint Gregory of Nyssa from Anatolia, demonstrating a diversified use of water-power in many parts of the Roman Empire.

The three finds push back the date of the invention of the crank and connecting rod mechanism by a full millennium; for the first time, all essential components of the much later steam engine were assembled by one technological culture:

With the crank and connecting rod system, all elements for constructing a steam engine (invented in 1712) — Hero's aeolipile (generating steam power), the cylinder and piston (in metal force pumps), non-return valves (in water pumps), gearing (in water mills and clocks) — were known in Roman times.

== See also ==
- List of Roman watermills
- Barbegal aqueduct and mill

== Sources ==
Roman sawmill at Hierapolis

- Ritti, Tullia; Grewe, Klaus; Kessener, Paul (2007), "A Relief of a Water-powered Stone Saw Mill on a Sarcophagus at Hierapolis and its Implications", Journal of Roman Archaeology, vol. 20, pp. 138–163, doi:10.1017/S1047759400005341, S2CID 161937987
- Grewe, Klaus (2009), "Die Reliefdarstellung einer antiken Steinsägemaschine aus Hierapolis in Phrygien und ihre Bedeutung für die Technikgeschichte. Internationale Konferenz 13.−16. Juni 2007 in Istanbul", in Bachmann, Martin (ed.), Bautechnik im antiken und vorantiken Kleinasien (PDF), Byzas (in German), vol. 9, Istanbul: Ege Yayınları/Zero Prod. Ltd., pp. 429–454, ISBN 978-975-8072-23-1, archived from the original (PDF) on 2011-05-11
- Grewe, Klaus (2010), "La máquina romana de serrar piedras. La representación en bajorrelieve de una sierra de piedras de la antigüedad, en Hierápolis de Frigia y su relevancia para la historia técnica (translation by Miguel Ordóñez)", Las técnicas y las construcciones de la Ingeniería Romana (PDF), V Congreso de las Obras Públicas Romanas (in Spanish), pp. 381–401

Roman sawmill at Gerasa

- Seigne, J. (2002a), "Une scierie mécanique au VIe siècle", Archéologia (in French), vol. 385, pp. 36–37
- Seigne, J. (2002b), "Sixth-Century Waterpowered Sawmill", Journal of the International Society of Molinology, vol. 64, pp. 14–16
- Seigne, J. (2002c), "A Sixth Century Water-powered Sawmill at Jerash", Annual of the Department of Antiquities of Jordan, vol. 26, pp. 205–213

Roman sawmill at Ephesos

- Mangartz, Fritz (2010), Die byzantinische Steinsäge von Ephesos. Baubefund, Rekonstruktion, Architekturteile, Monographs of the RGZM (in German), vol. 86, Mainz: Römisch-Germanisches Zentralmuseum, ISBN 978-3-88467-149-8

Possible Roman sawmill at Augusta Raurica

- Schiöler, Thorkild (2009), "Die Kurbelwelle von Augst und die römische Steinsägemühle", Helvetia Archaeologica (in German), vol. 40, no. 159/160, pp. 113–124
