= Medieval technology =

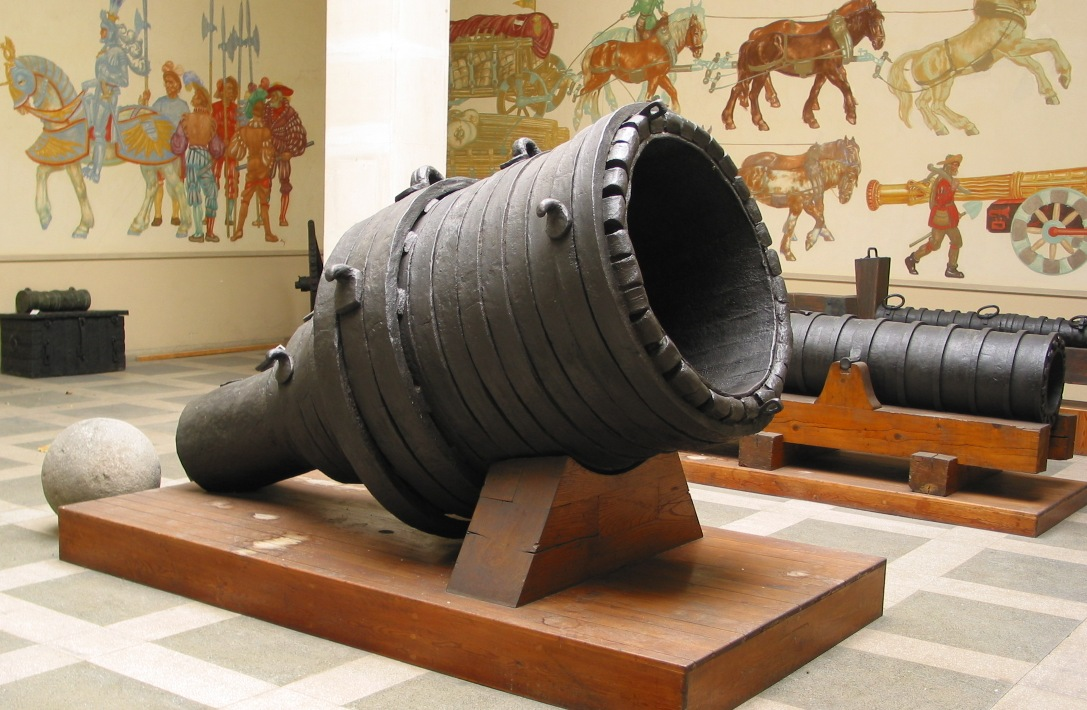
Pumhart von Steyr, a 15th-century very large-calibre cannon

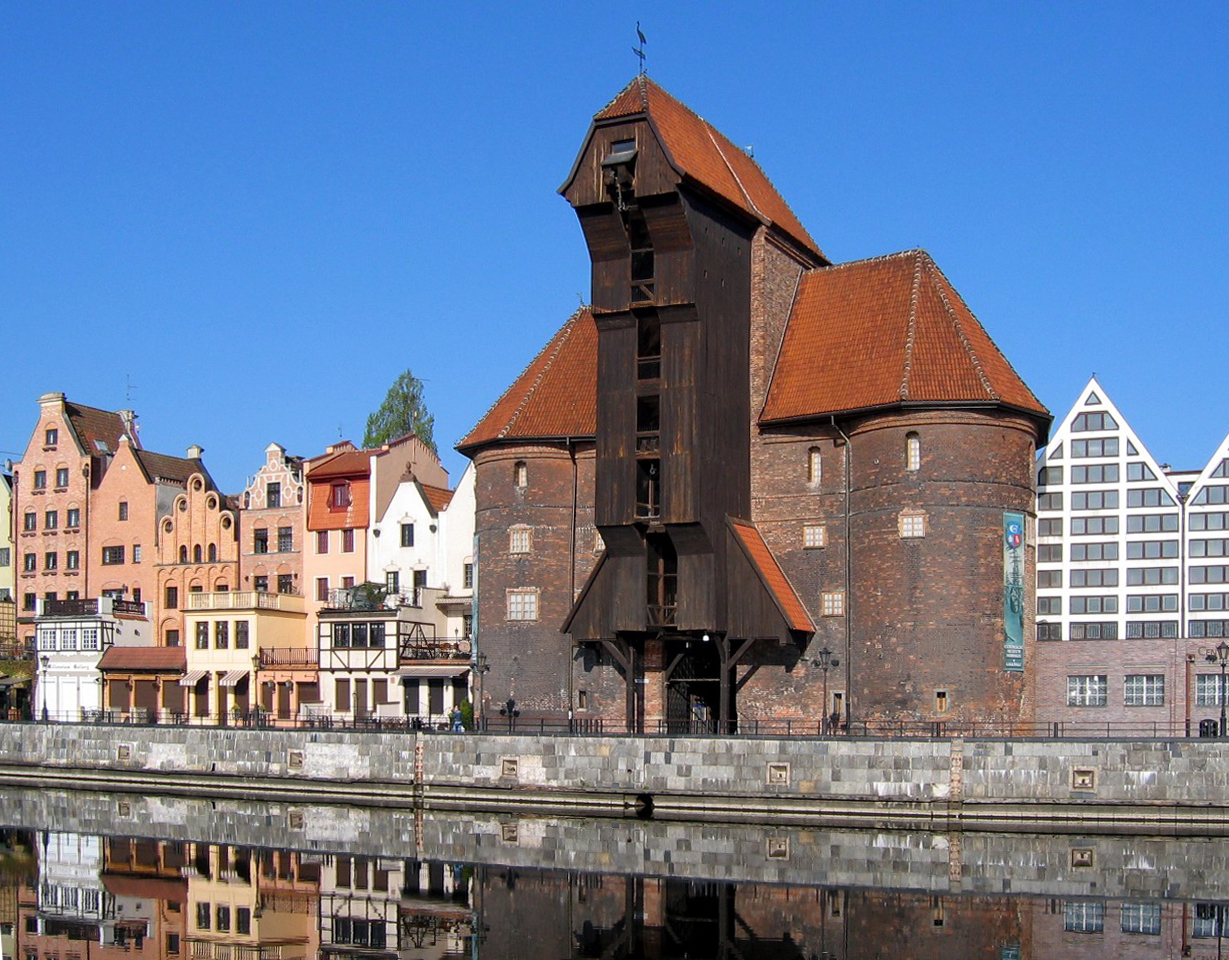
Medieval port crane for mounting masts and lifting heavy cargo in the former Hanse town of Gdańsk

Medieval technology is the technology used in medieval Europe under Christian rule. After the Renaissance of the 12th century, medieval Europe saw a radical change in the rate of new inventions, innovations in the ways of managing traditional means of production, and economic growth. The period saw major technological advances, including the adoption of gunpowder, the invention of vertical windmills, spectacles, mechanical clocks, and greatly improved water mills, building techniques (Gothic architecture, medieval castles), and agriculture in general (three-field crop rotation).

The development of water mills from their ancient origins was impressive, and extended from agriculture to sawmills both for timber and stone. By the time of the Domesday Book, most large villages had turnable mills, around 6,500 in England alone. Water power was also widely used in mining for raising ore from shafts, crushing ore, and even powering bellows.

Many European technical advancements from the 12th to 14th centuries were either built on long-established techniques in medieval Europe, originating from Roman and Byzantine antecedents, or adapted from cross-cultural exchanges through trading networks with the Islamic world, China, and India. Often, the revolutionary aspect lay not in the act of invention itself, but in its technological refinement and application to political and economic power. Though gunpowder along with other weapons had been started by Chinese, it was the Europeans who developed and perfected its military potential, precipitating European expansion and eventual imperialism in the Modern Era.

Also significant in this respect were advances in maritime technology. Advances in shipbuilding included the multi-masted ships with lateen sails, the sternpost-mounted rudder and the frame-led hull construction. Along with new navigational techniques such as the dry compass, the Jacob's staff and the astrolabe, these allowed economic and military control of the seas adjacent to Europe and enabled the global navigational achievements of the dawning Age of Exploration.

At the turn to the Renaissance, Gutenberg's invention of mechanical printing made possible a dissemination of knowledge to a wider population, that would not only lead to a gradually more egalitarian society, but one more able to dominate other cultures, drawing from a vast reserve of knowledge and experience. The technical drawings of late-medieval artist-engineers Guido da Vigevano and Villard de Honnecourt can be viewed as forerunners of later Renaissance artist-engineers such as Taccola or Leonardo da Vinci.

== Civil technologies ==
The following is a list of some important medieval technologies. The approximate date or first mention of a technology in medieval Europe is given. Technologies were often a matter of cultural exchange and date and place of first inventions are not listed here (see main links for a more complete history of each).

=== Agriculture ===
Carruca (6th to 9th centuries)

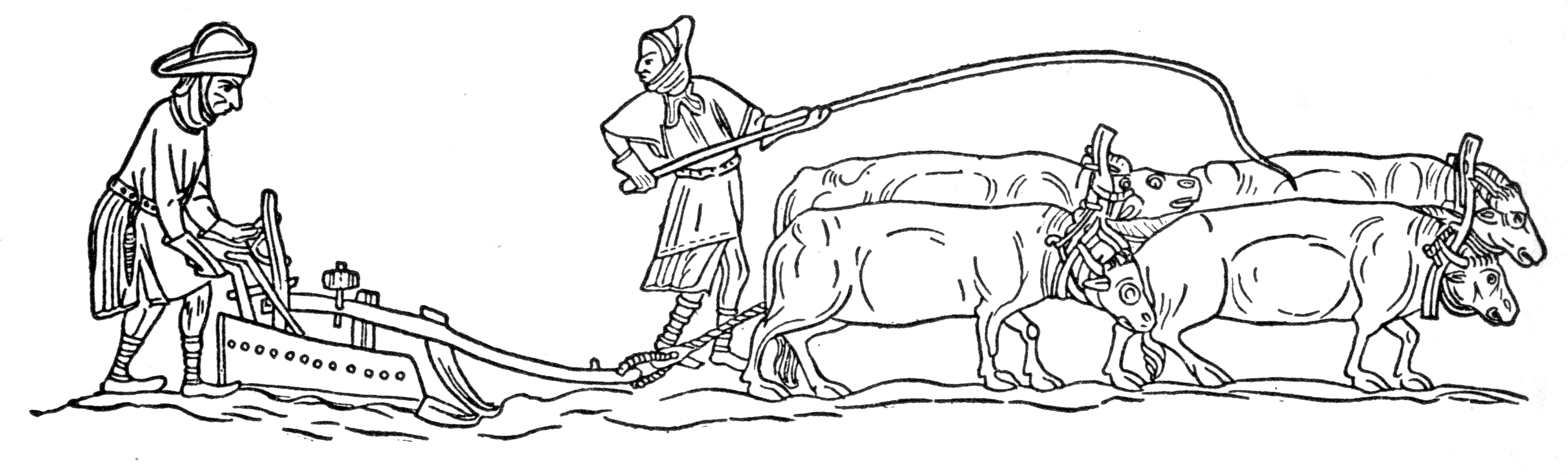
Carruca (Heavy Plough )

A type of heavy wheeled plough commonly found in Northern Europe. The device consisted of four major parts. The first part was a coulter at the bottom of the plough. This knife was used to vertically cut into the top sod to allow for the plowshare to work. The plowshare was the second pair of knives which cut the sod horizontally, detaching it from the ground below. The third part was the moldboard, which curled the sod outward. The fourth part of the device was the team of eight oxen guided by the farmer. This type of plough eliminated the need for cross-plowing by turning over the furrow instead of merely pushing it outward. This type of wheeled plough made seed placement more consistent throughout the farm as the blade could be locked in at a certain level relative to the wheels. A disadvantage to this type of plough was its poor maneuverability. Since this equipment was large and led by a small herd of oxen, turning the plough was difficult and time-consuming. This caused many farmers to turn away from traditional square fields and adopt a longer, more rectangular field to ensure maximum efficiency.

Ard (plough) (5th century)

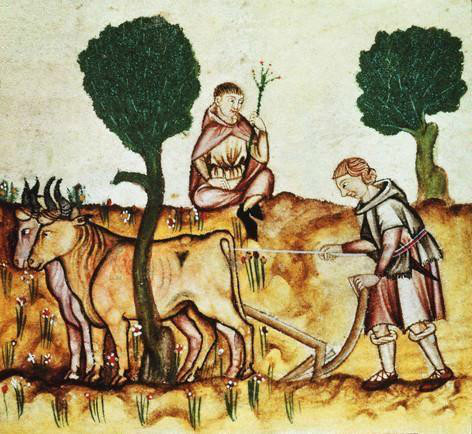
Medieval plough and oxen team

While ploughs have been used since ancient times, during the medieval period plough technology improved rapidly. The medieval plough, constructed from wooden beams, could be yoked to either humans or a team of oxen and pulled through any type of terrain. This allowed for faster clearing of forest lands for agriculture in parts of Northern Europe where the soil contained rocks and dense tree roots. With more food being produced, more people were able to live in these areas.

Horse collar (6th to 9th centuries)

Once oxen started to be replaced by horses on farms and in fields, the yoke became obsolete due to its shape not working well with a horses' posture. The first design for a horse collar was a throat-and-girth-harness. These types of harnesses were unreliable though due to them not being sufficiently set in place. The loose straps were prone to slipping and shifting positions as the horse was working and often caused asphyxiation. Around the eighth century, the introduction of the rigid collar eliminated the problem of choking. The rigid collar was "placed over the horses head and rested on its shoulders. This permitted unobstructed breathing and placed the weight of the plow or wagon where the horse could best support it."

Horseshoes (9th century)

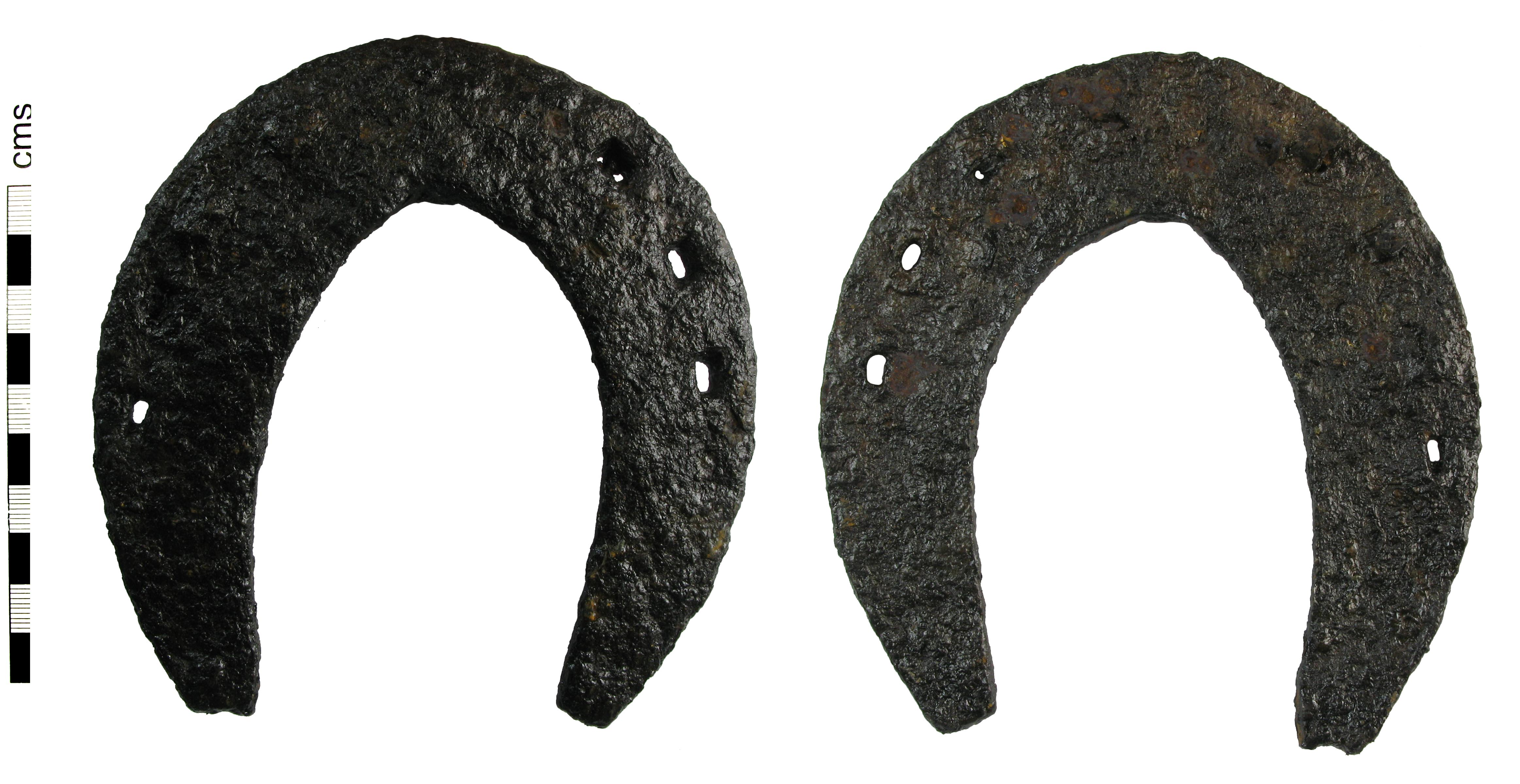
Medieval horseshoe

While horses are already able to travel on all terrain without a protective covering on the hooves, horseshoes allowed horses to travel faster along the more difficult terrains. The practice of shoeing horses was initially practiced in the Roman Empire but lost popularity throughout the Middle Ages until around the 11th century. Although horses in the southern lands could easily work while on the softer soil, the rocky soil of the north proved to be damaging to the horses' hooves. Since the north was the problematic area, this is where shoeing horses first became popular. The introduction of gravel roadways was also cause for the popularity of horseshoeing. The loads a shoed horse could take on these roads were significantly higher than one that was barefoot. By the 14th century, not only did horses have shoes, but many farmers were shoeing oxen and donkeys in order to help prolong the life of their hooves. The size and weight of the horseshoe changed significantly over the course of the Middle Ages. In the 10th century, horseshoes were secured by six nails and weighed around one-quarter of a pound, but throughout the years, the shoes grew larger and by the 14th century, the shoes were being secured with eight nails and weighed nearly half a pound.

Crop rotation

Two-field system

In this simpler form of crop rotation, one field would grow a crop while the other was allowed to lie fallow. The second field would be used to feed livestock and regain lost nutrients through being fertilized by their waste. Every year, the two fields would switch in order to ensure fields did not become nutrient deficient. In the 11th century, this system was introduced into Sweden and spread to become the most popular form of farming. The system of crop rotation is still used today by many farmers, who will grow corn one year in a field and will then grow beans or other legumes in the field the next year.

Three-field system (8th century)

While the two-field system was used by medieval farmers, a different system was also being developed at the same time. In a three-field system, one field holds a spring crop, such as barley or oats, another field holds a winter crop, such as wheat or rye, and the third field is an off-field that is left alone to grow and is used to help feed livestock. By rotating the three crops to a new part of the land after each year, the off-field regains some of the nutrients lost during the growing of the two crops. This system increases agricultural productivity over the two-field system by only having one-third of the land unused instead of one half. Many scholars believe it helped increase yields by up to 50%.

Wine press (12th century)

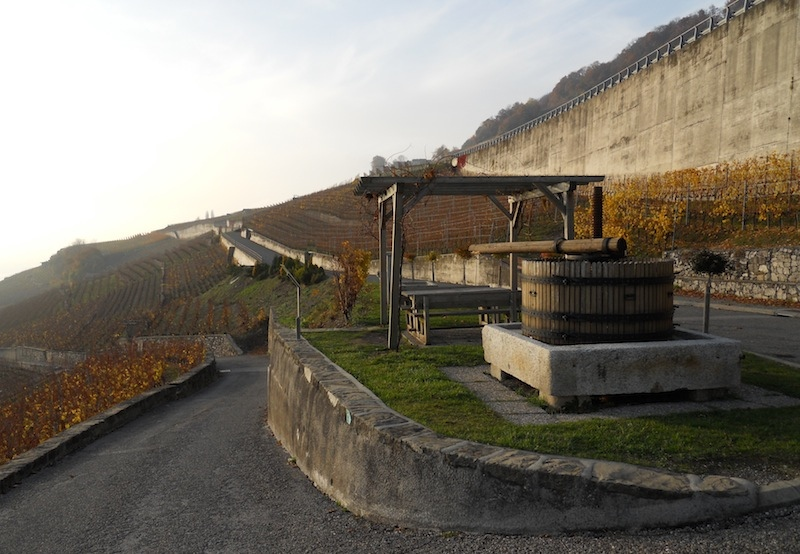
A wine press used in the medieval period to crush grapes.

During the medieval period the wine press had been constantly evolving into a more modern and efficient machine that would give wine makers more wine with less work. This device was the first practical means of pressing wine on a flat surface. The wine press was made of a giant wooden basket that was bound together by wooden or metal rings. At the top of the basket was a large disc that would depress the contents in the basket, crushing the grapes and producing the juice to be fermented.

The wine press was an expensive piece of machinery that only the wealthy could afford, and grape stomping was still often used as a less expensive alternative. While white wines required the use of a wine press in order to preserve the color of the wine by removing the juices quickly from the skin, red wine did not need to be pressed until the end of the juice removal process since the color did not matter. Many red wine winemakers used their feet to smash the grapes then used a press to remove any juice that remained in the grape skins.

Qanat (water ducts) (5th century)

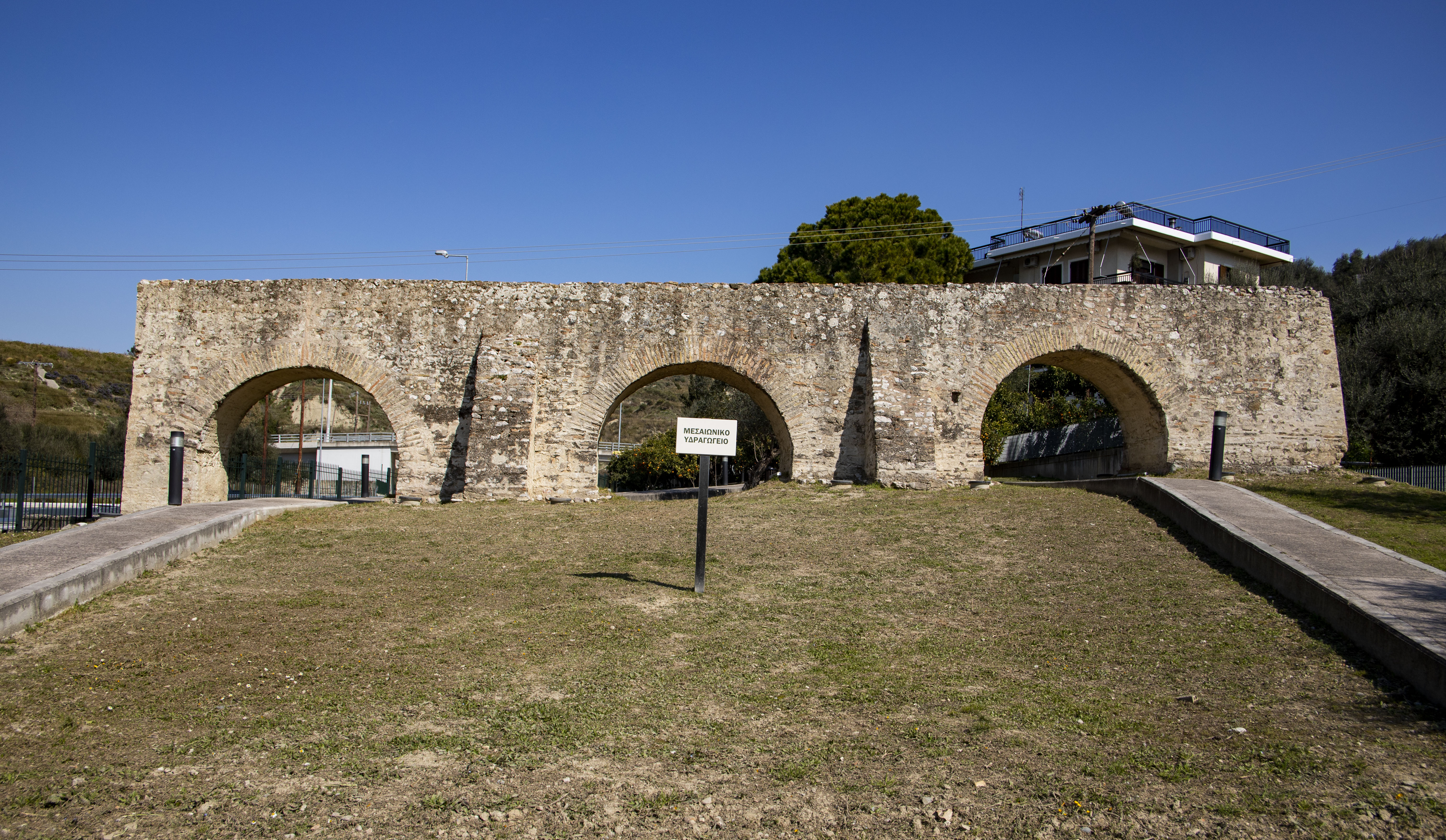
A medieval aqueduct unearthed

Ancient and medieval civilizations needed and used water to grow the human population as well as to partake in daily activities. One of the ways that ancient and medieval people gained access to water was through qanats, which were a water duct system that would bring water from an underground source or river source to villages or cities. A qanat is a tunnel that is just big enough that a single digger could travel through the tunnel and find the source of water as well as allow for water to travel through the duct system to farm land or villages for irrigation or drinking purposes. These tunnels had a gradual slope which used gravity to pull the water from either an aquifer or a water well. This system was originally found in middle eastern areas and is still used today in places where surface water is hard to find. Qanats were very helpful in not losing water while being transported as well. The most famous water duct system was the Roman aqueduct system, and medieval inventors used the aqueduct system as a blueprint for getting water to villages more quickly and easily than diverting rivers. After aqueducts and qanats much other water based technology was created and used in medieval periods including water mills, dams, wells and other such technology for easy access to water.

=== Architecture and construction ===
Pendentive architecture (6th century)

A specific spherical form in the upper corners to support a dome. Although the first experimentation was made in the 3rd century, it wasn't until the 6th century in the Byzantine Empire that its full potential was achieved.

Artesian well (1126)

A thin rod with a hard iron cutting edge is placed in the bore hole and repeatedly struck with a hammer, underground water pressure forces the water up the hole without pumping. Artesian wells are named after the town of Artois in France, where the first one was drilled by Carthusian monks in 1126.

Central heating through underfloor channels (9th century)

In the early medieval Alpine upland, a simpler central heating system where heat travelled through underfloor channels from the furnace room replaced the Roman hypocaust at some places. In Reichenau Abbey a network of interconnected underfloor channels heated the 300 m^{2} large assembly room of the monks during the winter months. The degree of efficiency of the system has been calculated at 90%.

Rib vault (12th century)

An essential element for the rise of Gothic architecture, rib vaults allowed vaults to be built for the first time over rectangles of unequal lengths. It also greatly facilitated scaffolding and largely replaced the older groin vault.

Chimney (12th century)

The first basic chimney appeared in a Swiss monastery in 820. The earliest true chimney did not appear until the 12th century, with the fireplace appearing at the same time.

Segmental arch bridge (1345)

The Ponte Vecchio in Florence is considered medieval Europe's first stone segmental arch bridge since the end of classical civilizations.

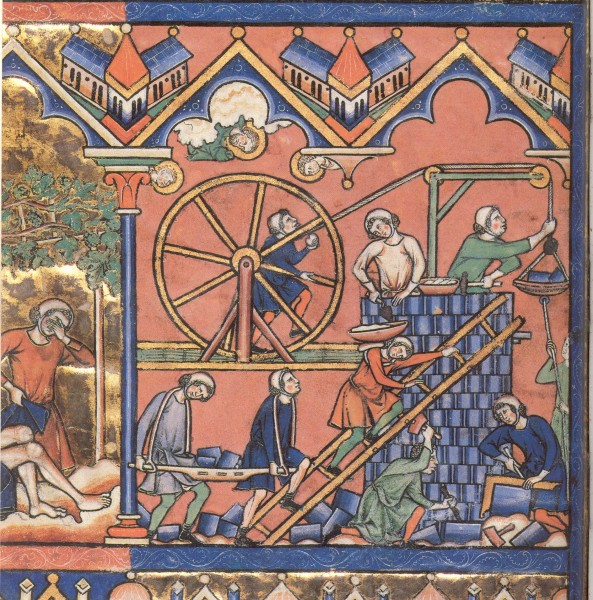
Treadwheel crane

Treadwheel crane (1220s)

The earliest reference to a treadwheel in archival literature is in France about 1225, followed by an illuminated depiction in a manuscript of probably also French origin dating to 1240. Apart from tread-drums, windlasses and occasionally cranks were employed for powering cranes.

Stationary harbour crane (1244)

Stationary harbour cranes are considered a new development of the Middle Ages; its earliest use being documented for Utrecht in 1244. The typical harbour crane was a pivoting structure equipped with double treadwheels. There were two types: wooden gantry cranes pivoting on a central vertical axle and stone tower cranes which housed the windlass and treadwheels with only the jib arm and roof rotating. These cranes were placed on docksides for the loading and unloading of cargo where they replaced or complemented older lifting methods like see-saws, winches and yards. Slewing cranes which allowed a rotation of the load and were thus particularly suited for dockside work appeared as early as 1340.

Floating crane

Beside the stationary cranes, floating cranes which could be flexibly deployed in the whole port basin came into use by the 14th century.

Portrait of a Man in a Turban, oil painting by Jan van Eyck (1433)

Mast crane

Some harbour cranes were specialised at mounting masts to newly built sailing ships, such as in Gdańsk, Cologne and Bremen.

Wheelbarrow (1170s)

The wheelbarrow proved useful in building construction, mining operations, and agriculture. Literary evidence for the use of wheelbarrows appeared between 1170 and 1250 in north-western Europe. The first depiction is in a drawing by Matthew Paris in the mid-13th century.

=== Art ===
Oil paint (by 1125)

As early as the 13th century, oil was used to add details to tempera paintings and paint wooden statues. Flemish painter Jan van Eyck developed the use of a stable oil mixture for panel painting around 1410.

=== Clocks ===
Hourglass (1338)

Reasonably dependable, affordable and accurate measure of time. Unlike water in a clepsydra, the rate of flow of sand is independent of the depth in the upper reservoir, and the instrument is not liable to freeze. Hourglasses are a medieval innovation (first documented in Siena, Italy).

Mechanical clocks (13th to 14th centuries)

A European innovation, these weight-driven clocks were used primarily in clock towers.

==== Candle clocks ====
Candle clocks were common in medieval Europe. And them used specified period of time.

=== Mechanics ===
Compound crank

The Italian physician Guido da Vigevano combines in his 1335 Texaurus, a collection of war machines intended for the recapture of the Holy Land, two simple cranks to form a compound crank for manually powering war carriages and paddle wheel boats. The devices were fitted directly to the vehicle's axle respectively to the shafts turning the paddle wheels.

=== Metallurgy ===
Blast furnace (1150–1350)

Cast iron had been made in China since before the 4th century BC. European cast iron first appears in Middle Europe (for instance Lapphyttan in Sweden, Dürstel in Switzerland and the Märkische Sauerland in Germany) around 1150, in some places according to recent research even before 1100. The technique is considered to be an independent European development.

=== Milling ===
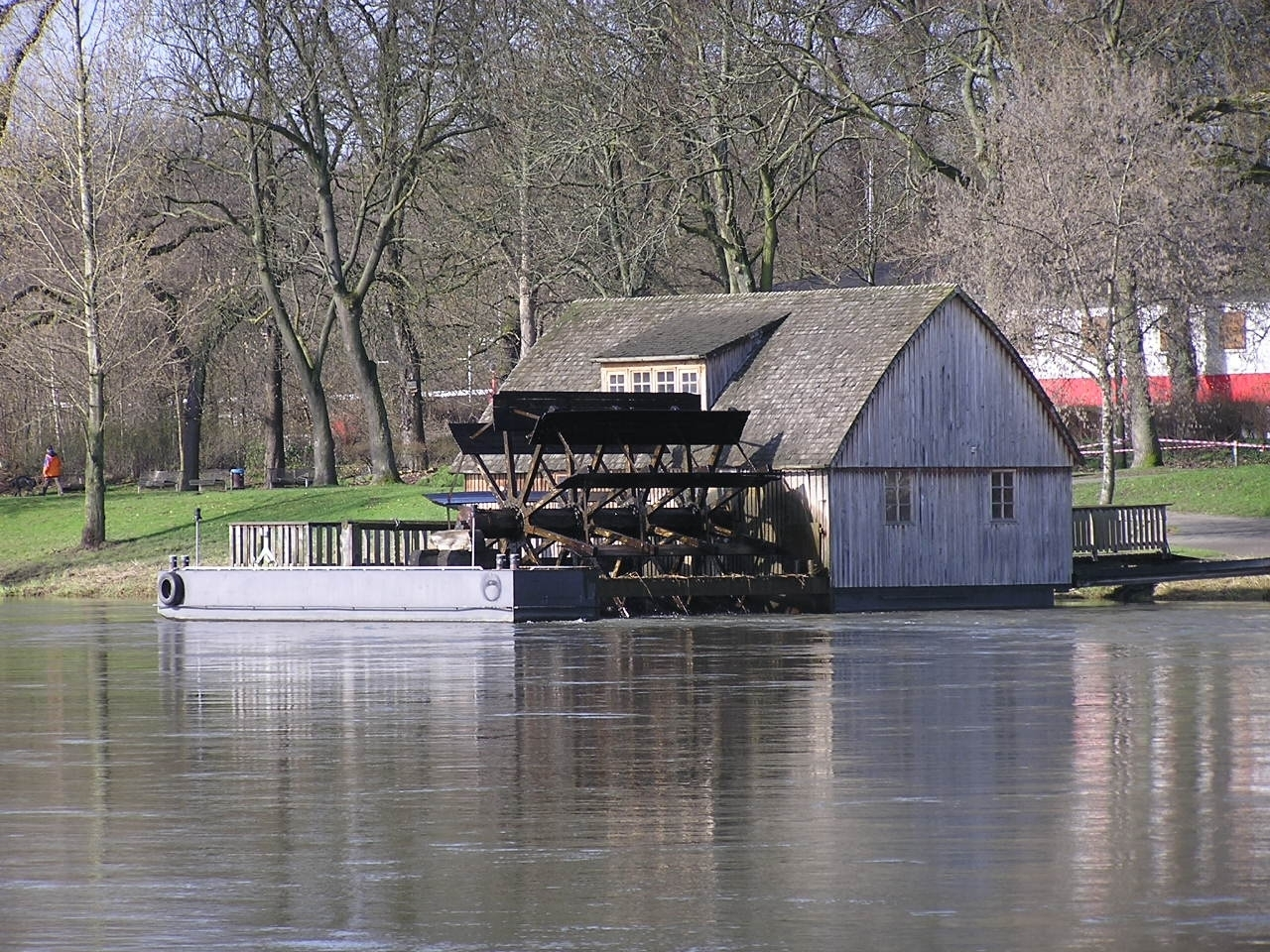
An example of a ship mill.

Ship mill (6th century)

The ship mill is a Byzantine invention, designed to mill grains using hydraulic power. The technology eventually spread to the rest of Europe and was in use until ca. 1800.

Paper mill (13th century)

The first certain use of a water-powered paper mill, evidence for which is elusive in both Chinese and Muslim paper making, dates to 1282.

Rolling mill (15th century)

Used to produce metal sheets of an even thickness. First used on soft, malleable metals, such as lead, gold and tin. Leonardo da Vinci described a rolling mill for wrought iron.

Tidal mills (6th century)

The earliest tidal mills were excavated on the Irish coast where watermillers knew and employed the two main waterwheel types: a 6th-century tide mill at Killoteran near Waterford was powered by a vertical waterwheel, while the tide changes at Little Island were exploited by a twin-flume horizontal-wheeled mill (c. 630) and a vertical undershot waterwheel alongside it. Another early example is the Nendrum Monastery mill from 787 which is estimated to have developed seven to eight horsepower at its peak.

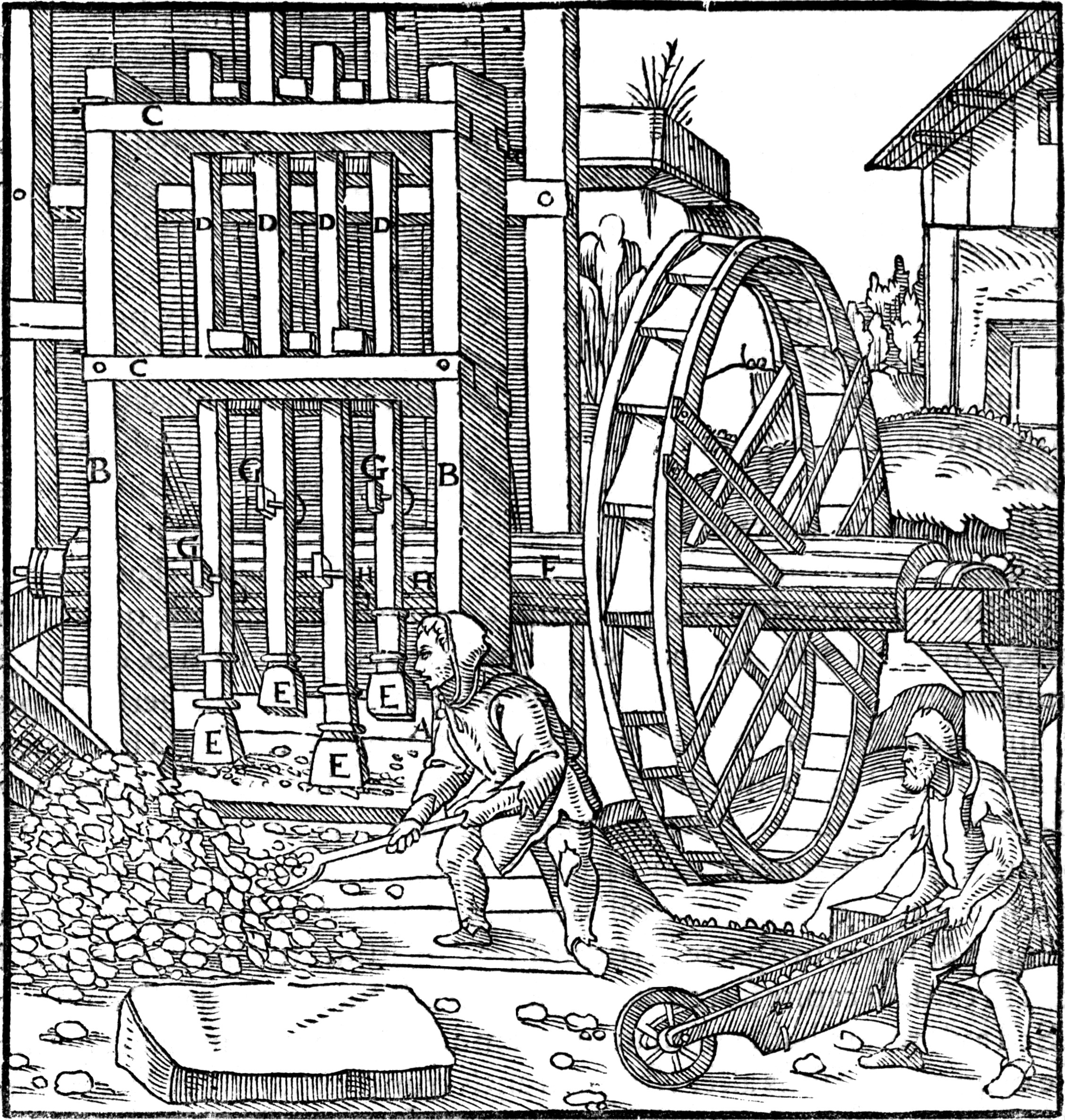
An example of a water hammer

Vertical windmills (1180s)

Invented in Europe as the pivotable post mill, the first surviving mention of one comes from Yorkshire in England in 1185. They were efficient at grinding grain or draining water. Stationary tower mills were also developed in the 13th century.

Water hammer (12th century at the latest)

Used in metallurgy to forge the metal blooms from bloomeries and Catalan forges, they replaced manual hammerwork. The water hammer was eventually superseded by steam hammers in the 19th century.

=== Navigation ===
Dry compass (12th century)

The first European mention of the directional compass is in Alexander Neckam's On the Natures of Things, written in Paris around 1190. It was either transmitted from China or the Arabs or an independent European innovation. Dry compass were invented in the Mediterranean around 1300.

Astronomical compass (1269)

The French scholar Pierre de Maricourt describes in his experimental study Epistola de magnete (1269) three different compass designs he has devised for the purpose of astronomical observation.

Scheme of a sternpost-mounted medieval rudder

Stern-mounted rudders (1180s)

The first depiction of a pintle-and-gudgeon rudder on church carvings dates to around 1180. They first appeared with cogs in the North and Baltic Seas and started to be used in the Mediterranean early in the 14th century. The iron hinge system was the first stern rudder permanently attached to the ship hull and made a vital contribution to the navigation achievements of the Age of Discovery and thereafter.

Merging of Northern European and Mediterranean maritime technology traditions

The movement of the sternpost-mounted rudder from Northern European waters to the Mediterranean was part of an exchange of maritime technology between the two regions. Before this, Mediterranean ships had used more than one mast, rigged only with lateen sails. (Square rig had disappeared from the Mediterranean after the classical period.) Their hulls were built with carvel construction. Northern ships were built with clinker construction and used square rig on a single mast. Square rig was reintroduced to the Mediterranean from Northern waters c. early 14th century. More than one mast was adopted in Northern Europe in the first two decades of the 15th century, with carvel ships being built in the region by the late 1430s. The result for both regions was the full-rigged ship, which was used (in steadily developing versions) until replaced by steamships late in the 19th century.

=== Printing, paper and reading ===
Movable type printing press (1440s)

Johannes Gutenberg's great innovation was not the printing itself, but instead of using carved plates as in woodblock printing, he used separate letters (types) from which the printing plates for pages were made up. This meant the types were recyclable and a page cast could be made up far faster.

Paper (13th century)

Paper was invented in China and transmitted through Islamic Spain in the 13th century. In Europe, the paper-making processes was mechanized by water-powered mills and paper presses (see paper mill).

Rotating bookmark (13th century)

A rotating disc and string device used to mark the page, column, and precise level in the text where a person left off reading in a text. Materials used were often leather, velum, or paper.

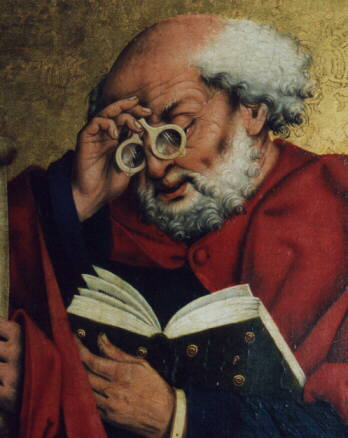
Reading Saint Peter with eyeglasses (1466)

Spectacles (1280s)

The first spectacles, invented in Florence, used convex lenses which were of help only to the far-sighted. Concave lenses were not developed prior to the 15th century.

Watermark (1282)

This medieval innovation was used to mark paper products and to discourage counterfeiting. It was first introduced in Bologna, Italy.

=== Science and learning ===
Theory of impetus (6th century)

A scientific theory that was introduced by John Philoponus who made criticism of Aristotelian principles of physics, and it served as an inspiration to medieval scholars as well as to Galileo Galilei who ten centuries later, during the Scientific Revolution, extensively cited Philoponus in his works while making the case as to why Aristotelian physics was flawed. It is the intellectual precursor to the concepts of inertia, momentum and acceleration in classical mechanics.

The first extant treatise of magnetism (13th century)

The first extant treatise describing the properties of magnets was done by Petrus Peregrinus de Maricourt when he wrote Epistola de magnete.

Arabic numerals (13th century)

The first recorded mention in Europe was in 976, and they were first widely published in 1202 by Fibonacci with his Liber Abaci.

University

The first medieval universities were founded between the 11th and 13th centuries leading to a rise in literacy and learning. By 1500, the institution had spread throughout most of Europe and played a key role in the Scientific Revolution. Today, the educational concept and institution has been globally adopted.

=== Textile industry and garments ===
Functional button (13th century)

German buttons appeared in 13th-century Germany as an indigenous innovation. They soon became widespread with the rise of snug-fitting clothing.

Horizontal loom (11th century)

Horizontal looms operated by foot-treadles were faster and more efficient.

Silk (6th century)

Manufacture of silk began in Eastern Europe in the 6th century and in Western Europe in the 11th or 12th century. Silk had been imported over the Silk Road since antiquity. The technology of "silk throwing" was mastered in Tuscany in the 13th century. The silk works used waterpower and some regard these as the first mechanized textile mills.

Spinning wheel (13th century)

Brought to Europe probably from India.

=== Miscellaneous ===
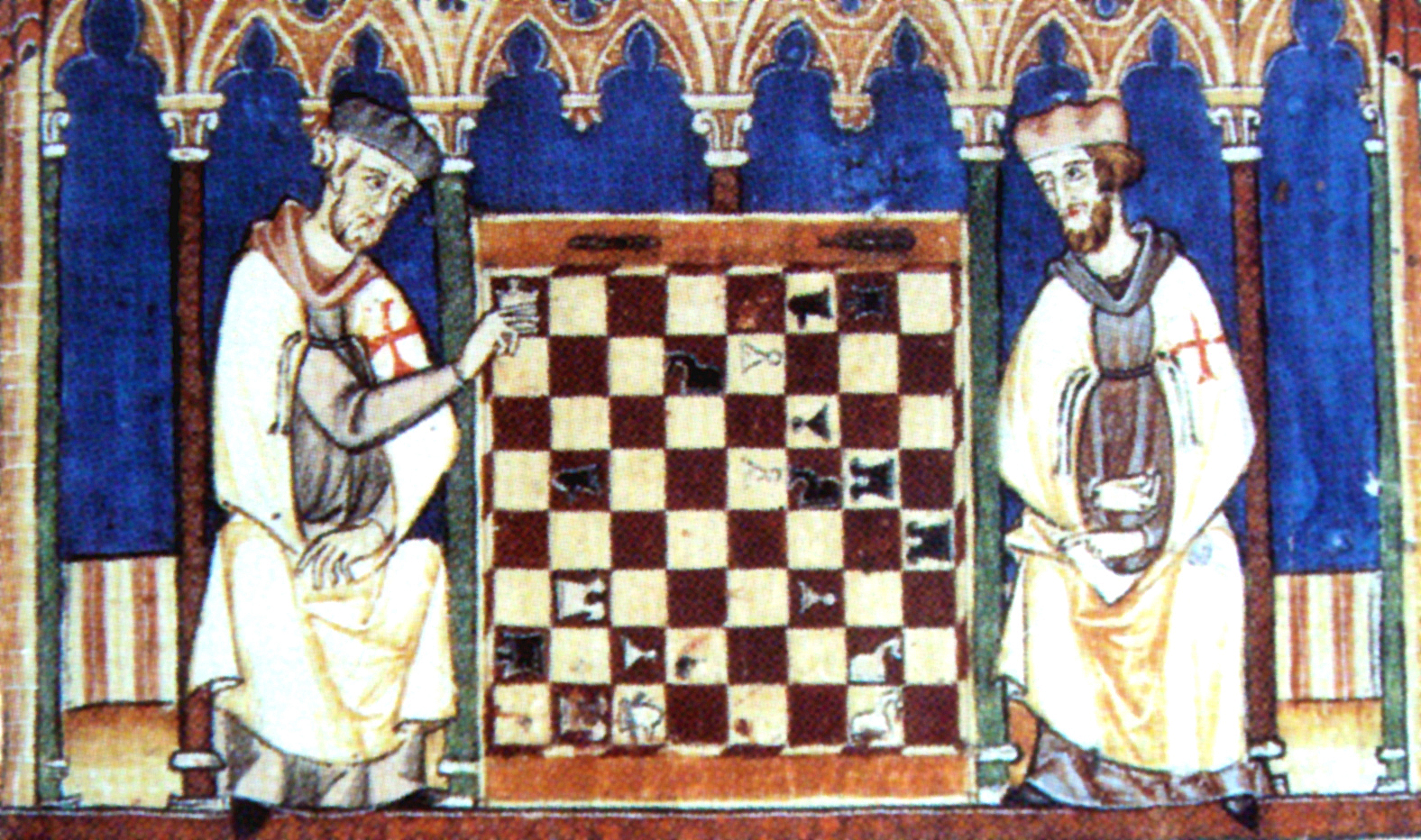
Knights Templar playing chess, Libro de los juegos (1283)

Chess (1450)

The earliest predecessors of the game originated in 6th-century AD India and spread via Persia and the Muslim world to Europe. Here the game evolved into its current form in the 15th century.

Forest glass (c. 1000)

This type of glass uses wood ash and sand as the main raw materials and is characterised by a variety of greenish-yellow colours.

Grindstones (834)

Grindstones are a rough stone, usually sandstone, used to sharpen iron. The first rotary grindstone (turned with a leveraged handle) occurs in the Utrecht Psalter, illustrated between 816 and 834. According to Hägermann, the pen drawing is a copy of a late-antique manuscript. A second crank which was mounted on the other end of the axle is depicted in the Luttrell Psalter from around 1340.

Liquor (12th century)

Primitive forms of distillation were known to the Babylonians, as well as Indians in the first centuries AD. Early evidence of distillation also comes from alchemists working in Alexandria, Roman Egypt, in the 1st century. The medieval Arabs adopted the distillation process, which later spread to Europe. Texts on the distillation of waters, wine, and other spirits were written in Salerno and Cologne in the twelfth and thirteenth centuries.

Liquor consumption rose dramatically in Europe in and after the mid-14th century, when distilled liquors were commonly used as remedies for the Black Death. These spirits would have had a much lower alcohol content (about 40% ABV) than the alchemists' pure distillations, and they were likely first thought of as medicinal elixirs. Around 1400, methods to distill spirits from wheat, barley, and rye were discovered. Thus began the "national" drinks of Europe, including gin (England) and grappa (Italy). In 1437, "burned water" (brandy) was mentioned in the records of the County of Katzenelnbogen in Germany.

Magnets (12th century)

Magnets were first referenced in the Roman d'Enéas, composed between 1155 and 1160.

Mirrors (1180)

The first mention of a "glass" mirror is in 1180 by Alexander Neckham who said "Take away the lead which is behind the glass and there will be no image of the one looking in."

Illustrated surgical atlas (1345)

Guido da Vigevano (c. 1280 − 1349) was the first author to add illustrations to his anatomical descriptions. His Anathomia provides pictures of neuroanatomical structures and techniques such as the dissection of the head by means of trephination, and depictions of the meninges, cerebrum, and spinal cord.

Quarantine (1377)

Initially a 40-day-period, the quarantine was introduced by the Republic of Ragusa as a measure of disease prevention related to the Black Death. It was later adopted by Venice from where the practice spread all around in Europe.

Rat traps (1170s)

The first mention of a rat trap is in the medieval romance Yvain, the Knight of the Lion by Chrétien de Troyes.

== Military technologies ==
=== Armour ===
Quilted armour (pre-5th–14th Century)

There was a vast amount of armour technology available through the 5th to 16th centuries. Most soldiers during this time wore padded or quilted armor. This was the cheapest and most available armor for the majority of soldiers. Quilted armour was usually just a jacket made of thick linen and wool meant to pad or soften the impact of blunt weapons and light blows. Although this technology predated the 5th century, it was still extremely prevalent because of the low cost and the weapon technology at the time made the bronze armor of the Greeks and Romans obsolete. Quilted armour was also used in conjunction with other types of armour. Usually worn over or under leather, mail, and later plate armour.

Cuir bouilli (5th–10th Century)

Hardened leather armour also called cuir bouilli was a step up from quilted armour. Made by boiling leather in either water, wax or oil to soften it so it can be shaped, it would then be allowed to dry and become very hard. Large pieces of armour could be made such as breastplates, helmets, and leg guards, but many times smaller pieces would be sewn into the quilting of quilted armour or strips would be sewn together on the outside of a linen jacket. This was not as affordable as the quilted armour but offered much better protection against edged slashing weapons.

Banded Mail Armour Construction

Chain mail (11th–16th Century)

The most common type during the 11th through the 16th centuries was the hauberk, also known earlier than the 11th century as the Carolingian byrnie. Made of interlinked rings of metal, it sometimes consisted of a coif that covered the head and a tunic that covered the torso, arms, and legs down to the knees. Chain mail was very effective at protecting against light slashing blows but ineffective against stabbing or thrusting blows. The great advantage was that it allowed great freedom of movement and was relatively light with significant protection over quilted or hardened leather armour. It was far more expensive than the hardened leather or quilted armour because of the massive amount of labor it required to create. This made it unattainable for most soldiers and only the more wealthy soldiers could afford it. Later, toward the end of the 13th century banded mail became popular. Constructed of washer shaped rings of iron overlapped and woven together by straps of leather as opposed to the interlinked metal rings of chain mail, banded mail was much more affordable to manufacture. The washers were so tightly woven together that it was very difficult penetrate and offered greater protection from arrow and bolt attacks.

Jazerant (11th century)

The jazerant or jazeraint was an adaptation of chain mail in which the chain mail would be sewn in between layers of linen or quilted armour. Exceptional protection against light slashing weapons and slightly improved protection against small thrusting weapons, but little protection against large blunt weapons such as maces and axes. This gave birth to reinforced chain mail and became more prevalent in the 12th and 13th century. Reinforced armour was made up of chain mail with metal plates or hardened leather plates sewn in. This greatly improved protection from stabbing and thrusting blows.

Scale armour (12th century)

A type of lamellar armour, was made up entirely of small, overlapping plates. Either sewn together, usually with leather straps, or attached to a backing such as linen, or a quilted armor. Scale armour does not require the labor to produce that chain mail does and therefore is more affordable. It also affords much better protection against thrusting blows and pointed weapons. Though, it is much heavier, more restrictive and impedes free movement.

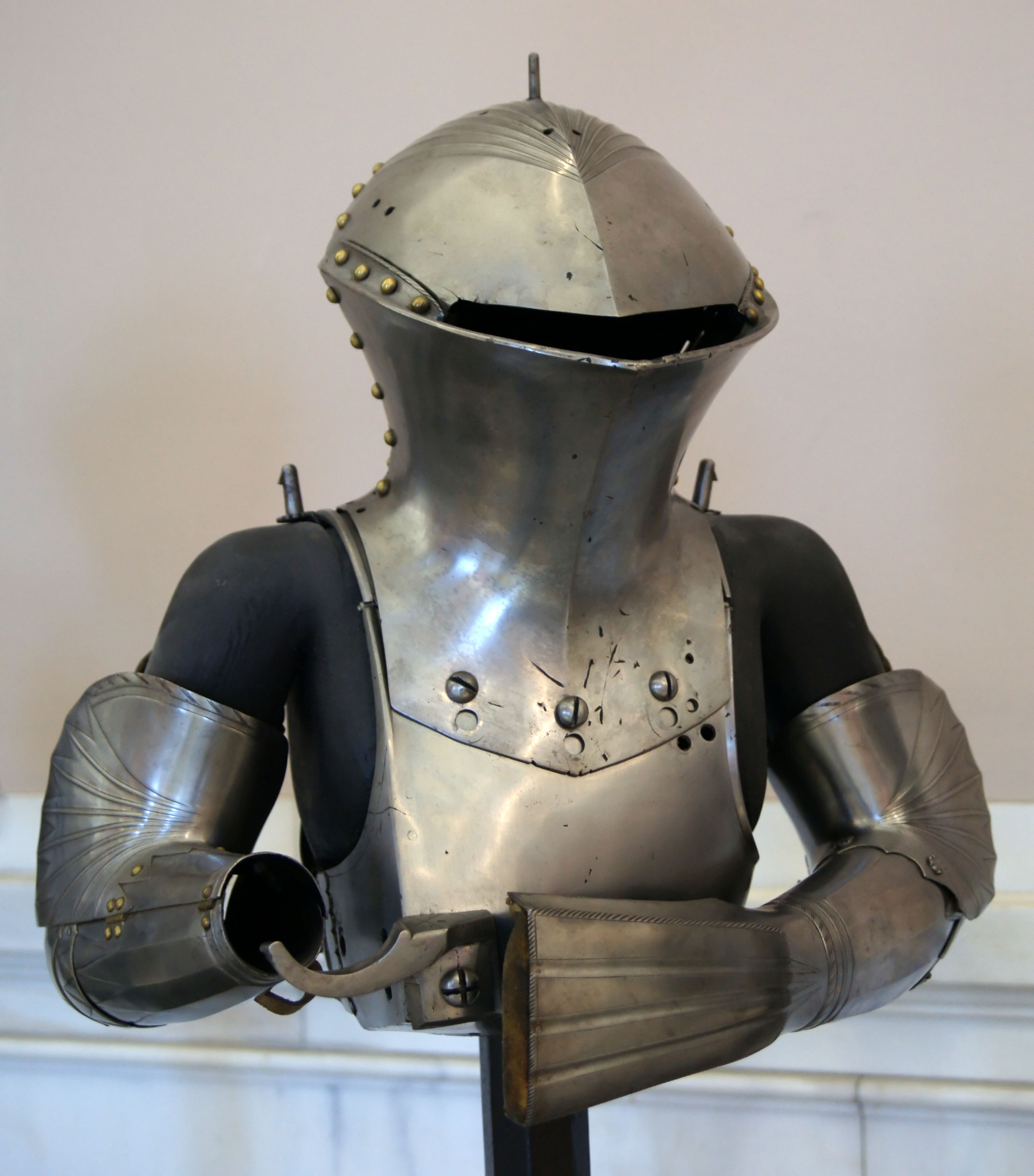
Jousting armor commissioned by Maximilian I in 1494

Plate armour (14th century)

Plate armour covered the entire body. Although parts of the body were already covered in plate armour as early as 1250, such as the poleyns for covering the knees and couters – plates that protected the elbows, the first complete full suit without any textiles was seen around 1410–1430. Components of medieval armour that made up a full suit consisted of a cuirass, a gorget, vambraces, gauntlets, cuisses, greaves, and sabatons held together by internal leather straps. Improved weaponry such as crossbows and the long bow had greatly increased range and power. This made penetration of the chain mail hauberk much easier and more common. By the mid-15th century most plate was worn alone and without the need of a hauberk. Advances in metal working such as the blast furnace and new techniques for carburizing made plate armour nearly impenetrable and the best armour protection available at the time. Although plate armour was fairly heavy, because each suit was custom tailored to the wearer, it was very easy to move around in. A full suit of plate armour was extremely expensive and mostly unattainable for the majority of soldiers. Only very wealthy land owners and nobility could afford it. The quality of plate armour increases as more armour makers became more proficient in metal working. A suit of plate armour became a symbol of social status and the best made were personalized with embellishments and engravings. Plate armour saw continued use in battle until the 17th century.

=== Cavalry ===
Arched saddle (11th century)

The arched saddle enabled mounted knights to wield lances underarm and prevent the charge from turning into an unintentional pole-vault. This innovation gave birth to true shock cavalry, enabling fighters to charge on full gallop.

Spurs (11th century)

Spurs were invented by the Normans and appeared at the same time as the cantled saddle. They enabled the horseman to control his horse with his feet, replacing the whip and leaving his arms free. Rowel spurs familiar from cowboy films were already known in the 13th century. Gilded spurs were the ultimate symbol of the knighthood – even today someone is said to "earn his spurs" by proving his or her worthiness.

Stirrup (6th century)

Stirrups were invented by steppe nomads in what is today Mongolia and northern China in the 4th century. They were introduced in Byzantium in the 6th century and in the Carolingian Empire in the 8th. They allowed a mounted knight to wield a sword and strike from a distance leading to a great advantage for mounted cavalry.

=== Gunpowder weapons ===
Cannon (1324)

Cannons are first recorded in Europe at the siege of Metz in 1324. In 1350 Petrarch wrote "these instruments which discharge balls of metal with most tremendous noise and flashes of fire...were a few years ago very rare and were viewed with greatest astonishment and admiration, but now they are become as common and familiar as kinds of arms."

Volley gun

See Ribauldequin.

Corned gunpowder (late 14th century)

First practiced in Western Europe, corning the black powder allowed for more powerful and faster ignition of cannons. It also facilitated the storage and transportation of black powder. Corning constituted a crucial step in the evolution of gunpowder warfare.

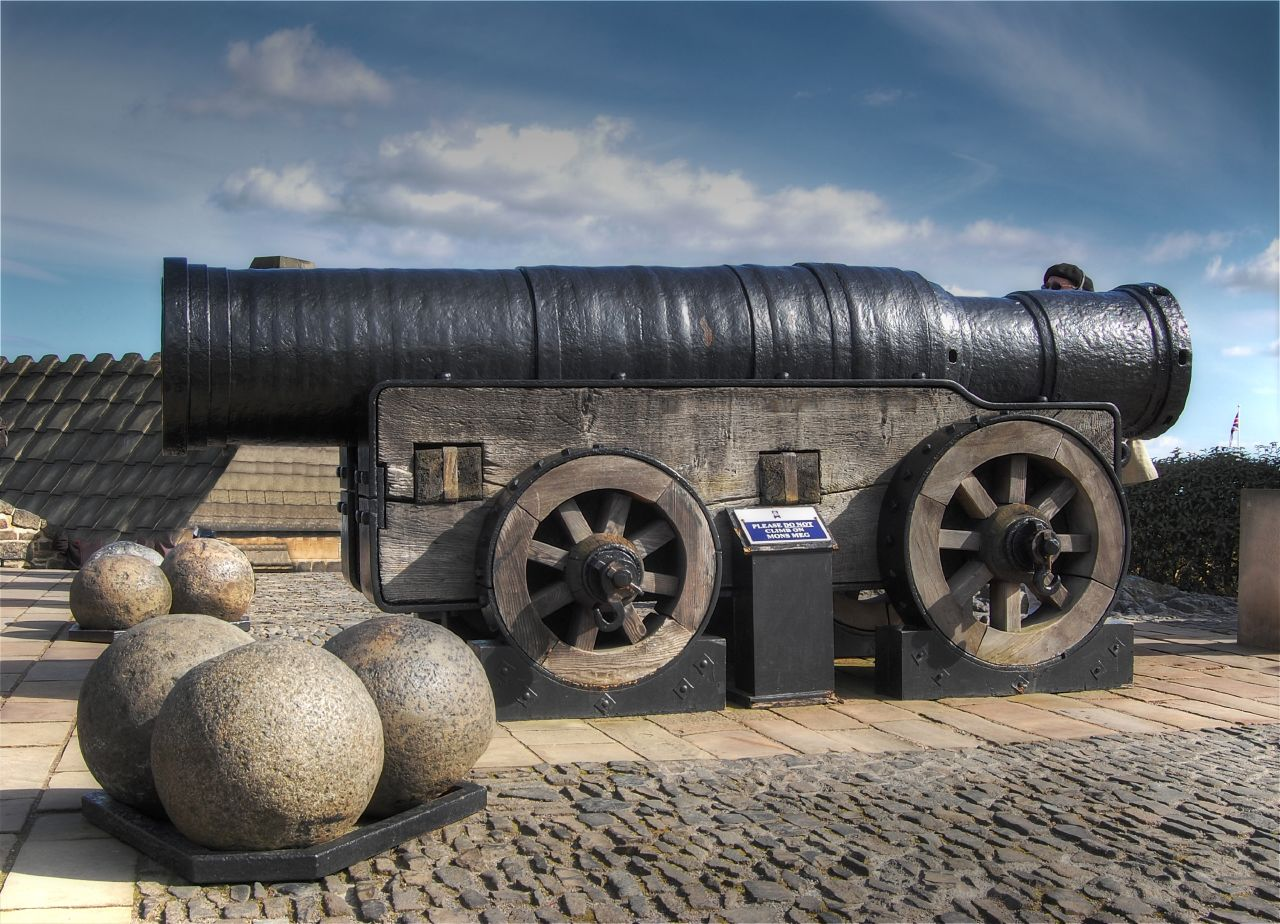
Scottish bombard Mons Meg

Very large-calibre cannon (late 14th century)

Extant examples include the wrought-iron Pumhart von Steyr, Dulle Griet and Mons Meg as well as the cast-bronze Faule Mette and Faule Grete (all from the 15th century).

=== Mechanical artillery ===
Counterweight trebuchet (12th century)

Powered solely by the force of gravity, these catapults revolutionized medieval siege warfare and construction of fortifications by hurling huge stones unprecedented distances. Originating somewhere in the eastern Mediterranean basin, counterweight trebuchets were introduced in the Byzantine Empire around 1100 CE, and was later adopted by the Crusader states and as well by the other armies of Europe and Asia.

=== Missile weapons ===
Greek fire (7th century)

An incendiary weapon which could even burn on water is also attributed to the Byzantines, where they installed it on their ships. It played a crucial role in the Byzantine Empire's victory over the Umayyad Caliphate during the 717-718 Siege of Constantinople.

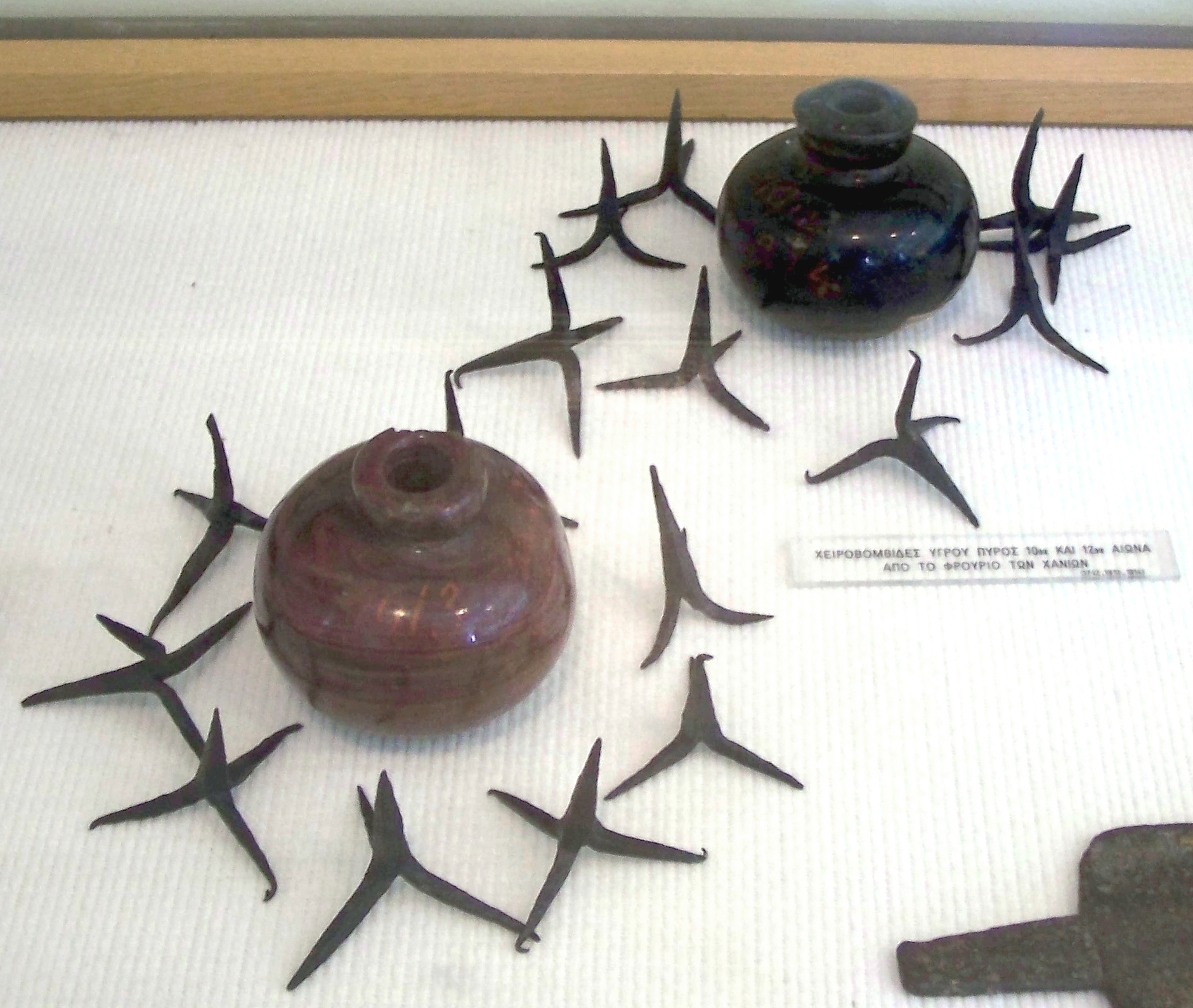
Ceramic grenades that were filled with Greek fire, surrounded by caltrops, 10th–12th century, National Historical Museum, Athens, Greece

Grenade (8th century)

Rudimentary incendiary grenades appeared in the Byzantine Empire, as the Byzantine soldiers learned that Greek fire, a Byzantine invention of the previous century, could not only be thrown by flamethrowers at the enemy, but also in stone and ceramic jars.

Longbow with massed, disciplined archery (13th century)

Having a high rate of fire and penetration power, the longbow contributed to the eventual demise of the medieval knight class. Used particularly by the English to great effect against the French cavalry during the Hundred Years' War (1337–1453).

Steel crossbow (late 14th century)

European innovation came with several different cocking aids to enhance draw power, making the weapons also the first hand-held mechanical crossbows.

== Gallery ==
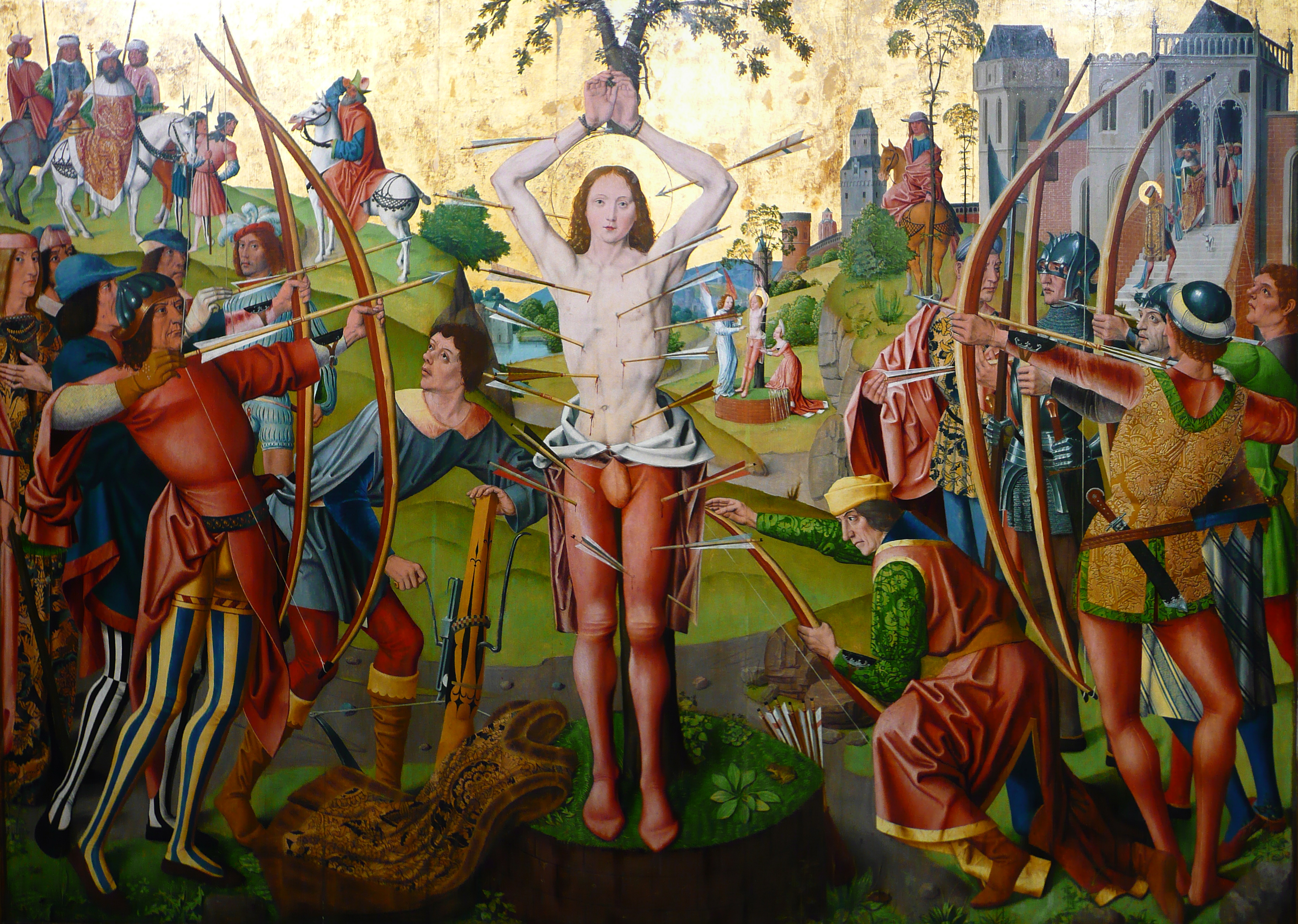
Longbowmen (c. 1493)

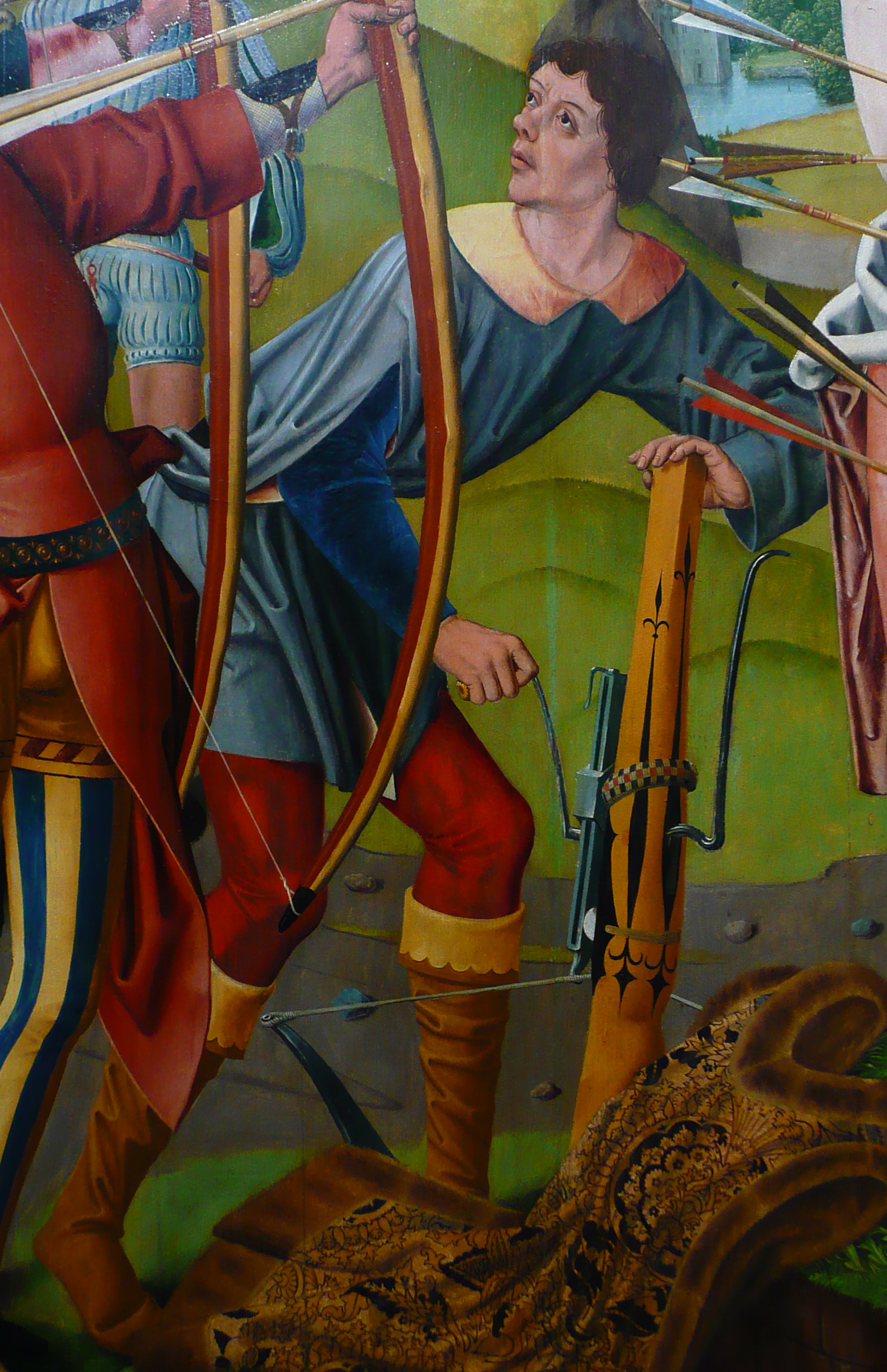
Cranked rack-and-pinion device for cocking a crossbow (c. 1493)

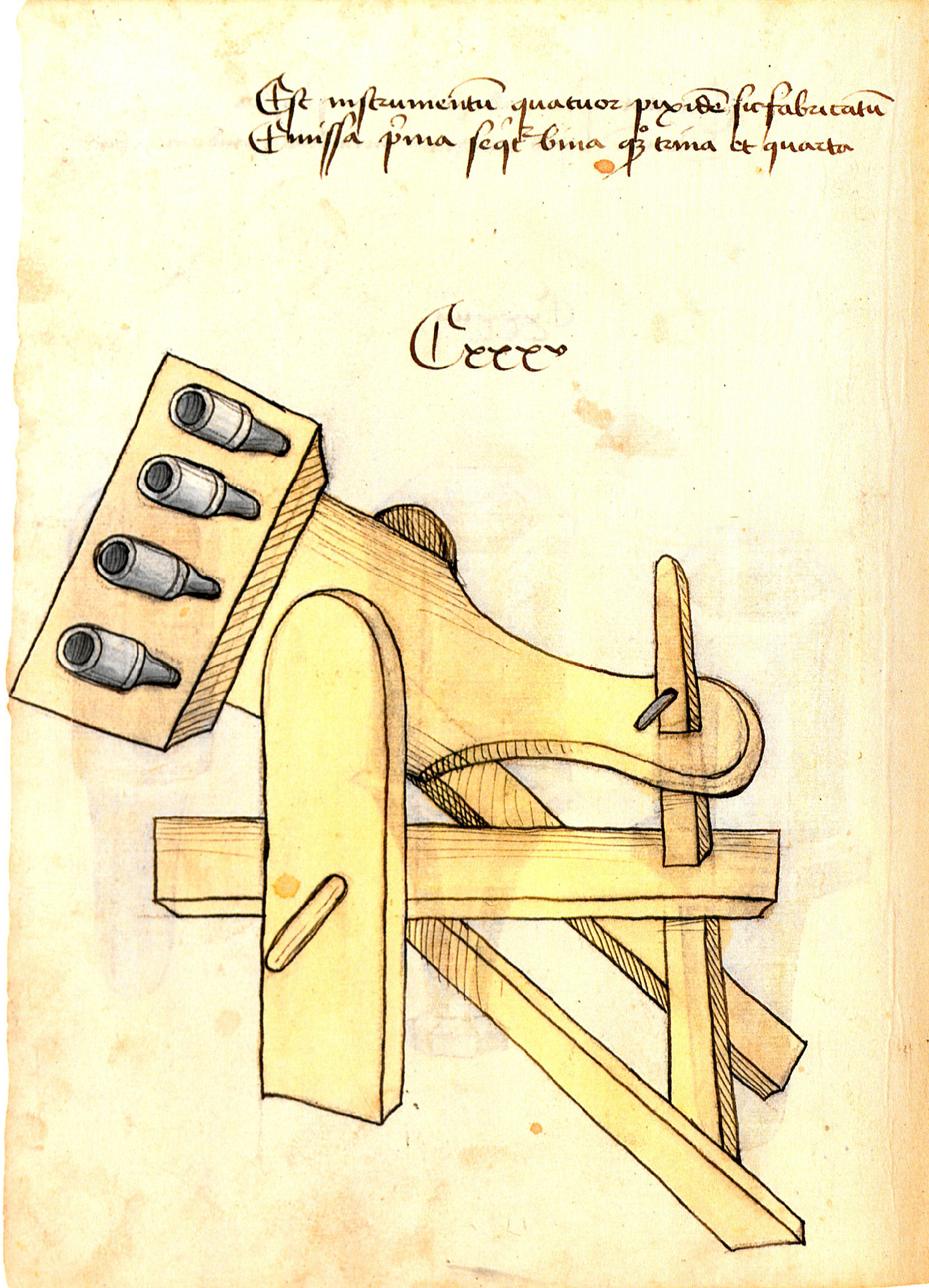
Organ gun in the Bellifortis (c. 1405)

== Bibliography ==
- Adams, Jonathan (2013). A maritime archaeology of ships : innovation and social change in medieval and early modern Europe (1st ed.). Oxford, UK. ISBN 978-1-84217-297-1.
- Andrews, Francis B. The Medieval Builder and His Methods. New York: Barnes & Noble, 1973. Medieval construction technique, with a brief chapter on tools.
- Blair, John, and Nigel Ramsay, editors. English Medieval Industries: Craftsmen, Techniques, Products London: Hambledon Press. 1991. ISBN 1-85285-326-3
- Burns, Robert I. (1996), "Paper comes to the West, 800−1400", in Lindgren, Uta (ed.), Europäische Technik im Mittelalter. 800 bis 1400. Tradition und Innovation (4th ed.), Berlin: Gebr. Mann Verlag, pp. 413–422, ISBN 3-7861-1748-9
- Crosby, Alfred. The Measure of Reality : Quantification in Western Europe, 1250-1600. Cambridge: Cambridge University Press, 1997
- Jared Diamond, Guns, germs and steel. A short history of everybody for the last 13'000 years, 1997.
- Di Ieva, Antonio; et al. (2007), "The Neuroanatomical Plates of Guido da Vigevano", Neurosurgical Focus, 23 (1): 1–4, doi:10.3171/FOC-07/07/E15, S2CID 32610686
- Gies, Frances and Joseph. Cathedral, Forge, and Waterwheel: Technology and Invention in the Middle Ages. New York: HarperCollins, 1994. ISBN 0-06-092581-7
- Gimpel, Jean. The Medieval Machine: The Industrial Revolution of the Middle Ages. London: Pimlico, (2nd ed. 1992) ISBN 0-14-004514-7
- Hägermann, Dieter; Schneider, Helmuth (1997), Propyläen Technikgeschichte. Landbau und Handwerk, 750 v. Chr. bis 1000 n. Chr (2nd ed.), Berlin, ISBN 3-549-05632-X
- Hall, Bert S. (1979), The Technological Illustrations of the So-Called "Anonymous of the Hussite Wars". Codex Latinus Monacensis 197, Part 1, Wiesbaden: Dr. Ludwig Reichert Verlag, ISBN 3-920153-93-6
- Holt, Richard (1988), The Mills of Medieval England, Oxford: Blackwell Publishers, ISBN 978-0-631-15692-5
- Long, Pamela O., editor. Science and Technology in Medieval Society. in Annals of the New York Academy of Sciences, vol 441 New York: New York Academy of Sciences, 1985 ISBN 0-89766-277-6 A series of papers on highly specific topics.
- Lucas, Adam Robert (2005), "Industrial Milling in the Ancient and Medieval Worlds. A Survey of the Evidence for an Industrial Revolution in Medieval Europe", Technology and Culture, 46 (1): 1–30, doi:10.1353/tech.2005.0026, S2CID 109564224
- Makdisi, George (1970), "Madrasa and University in the Middle Ages", Studia Islamica, 32 (32): 255–264, doi:10.2307/1595223, JSTOR 1595223
- Matheus, Michael (1996), "Mittelalterliche Hafenkräne", in Lindgren, Uta (ed.), Europäische Technik im Mittelalter. 800 bis 1400. Tradition und Innovation (4th ed.), Berlin: Gebr. Mann Verlag, pp. 345–348, ISBN 3-7861-1748-9
- Matthies, Andrea (1992), "Medieval Treadwheels. Artists' Views of Building Construction", Technology and Culture, 33 (3): 510–547, doi:10.2307/3106635, JSTOR 3106635, S2CID 113201185
- McErlean, Thomas; Crothers, Norman (2007), Harnessing the Tides: The Early Medieval Tide Mills at Nendrum Monastery, Strangford Lough, Belfast: Stationery Office Books, ISBN 978-0-337-08877-3
- Murphy, Donald (2005), Excavations of a Mill at Killoteran, Co. Waterford as Part of the N-25 Waterford By-Pass Project (PDF), Estuarine/ Alluvial Archaeology in Ireland. Towards Best Practice, University College Dublin and National Roads Authority, archived from the original (PDF) on 2007-11-18
- Rynne, Colin (2000), "Waterpower in Medieval Ireland", in Squatriti, Paolo (ed.), Working with Water in Medieval Europe, Technology and Change in History, vol. 3, Leiden: Brill, pp. 1–50, ISBN 90-04-10680-4
- Singer, Charles, editor. History of Technology. Oxford: Oxford University Press, 1954. Volumes II and III cover the Middle Ages with great scope and detail. This is the standard work.
- Taylor, E. g. r. (1951), "The South-Pointing Needle", Imago Mundi, 8: 1–7, doi:10.1080/03085695108591973
- Thompson, Susan (1978), "Paper Manufacturing and Early Books", Annals of the New York Academy of Sciences, 314 (1): 167–176, Bibcode:1978NYASA.314..167T, doi:10.1111/j.1749-6632.1978.tb47791.x, S2CID 85153174
- White, Lynn Jr. (1962), Medieval Technology and Social Change, Oxford: At the Clarendon Press
- White, Lynn Jr., "The Study of Medieval Technology, 1924-1974: Personal Reflections" Technology and Culture 16.4 (October 1975), pp. 519–530. A chronology and basic bibliography of landmark studies.
- Wikander, Örjan (1985), "Archaeological Evidence for Early Water-Mills. An Interim Report", History of Technology, vol. 10, pp. 151–179

== See also ==
Earlier periods:

- Ancient Greek technology
- Ancient Roman technology

Medieval period:

- Medieval medicine of Western Europe
- Medieval transport
- Renaissance of the 12th century
- Islamic Golden Age
- List of inventions in the medieval Islamic world
- History of science and technology in the Indian subcontinent

General:

- History of technology
