= List of historical harbour cranes =

The list of historical harbour cranes includes historical harbour cranes from the Middle Ages to the introduction of metal cranes in the Industrial Revolution during the 19th century. Modern reconstructions are also listed.

Name	Location	Country	River	Comment	Material	Image
Żuraw (Krantor)	Gdańsk (Danzig)	Poland	Motława (Mottlau)	1367, modification 1442–1444; oldest crane in the formerly German-speaking area	Stone and wood	
Stadskraan (Utrecht)	Utrecht	Netherlands	Oudegracht	1402, treadwheeled city crane mainly used for wine barrels, several times upgraded, rebuilt on another location after it collapsed in 1837.	Wood/stone	
Alter Krahnen	Trier	Germany	Mosel	1413, in service until 1910, two booms, one to attach a counterweight	Stone	
Rheinkran	Bingen	Germany	Rhine	1487, renovated in 1819, in service until 1890; after comprehensive renovation back in service (tourist demonstrations) since 2008	Wood	
Alter Krahnen	Andernach	Germany	Rhine	1554–1561, in service until 1911	Stone	
Oestricher Kran	Oestrich-Winkel	Germany	Rhine	1744–1745, in service until 1926	Wood	
Mastekran (Mastekranen)	Copenhagen	Denmark	Holmen, harbour	1748-1751 by Philip de Lange; for mounting masts to large sailing vessels	Stone and wood	
Styckekranen (Styckekranen)	Stockholm	Sweden	Mälaren	Built in 1751, it replaced another crane from 1647. A historic monument since 1935, it was damaged in a fire in 1978 but restored.	Wood, iron cladding	
Alter Kranen	Würzburg	Germany	Main	1767–1773 by Franz Neumann, two booms, each with chain and hook	Stone	
Zollkran	Trier	Germany	Mosel	1774, in service until 1900, two booms, one to attach a counterweight	Stone	
Alter Kranen	Marktbreit	Germany	Main	ca. 1750 (wood); rebuilt (stone) after the 1784 ice flood, in service til 1900	Stone	
Alter Krahn; Alter Salzkran	Lüneburg	Germany	Ilmenau	1379; reconstructed in 1797 after ice flood, in service until 1860	Wood	
Harbour crane	Rostock	Germany	Lower Warnow	first crane in the 16th century; reconstruction from an 18th-century crane	Wood	
Alter Salzkran	Stade	Germany	Schwinge	1661, in 1898 demolished, in 1977 reconstructed on the model of the Alter Krahn in Lüneburg	Wood	
Alter Saarkran	Saarbrücken	Germany	Saar	1762 by F.-J. Stengel, 1784 renovated; ruined state after 1865; reconstructed in 1989	Wood	
Havenkraan, Hanzekraan	Bruges	Belgium	Kraanplein (CraenePlaetse)	1288, rebuilt in 1434, in service til 1767; modern small-scale reconstruction of the medieval crane at Brugge harbour depicted, two treadwheels;	Wood	

== See also ==
- Treadwheel crane
