= Guido da Vigevano =

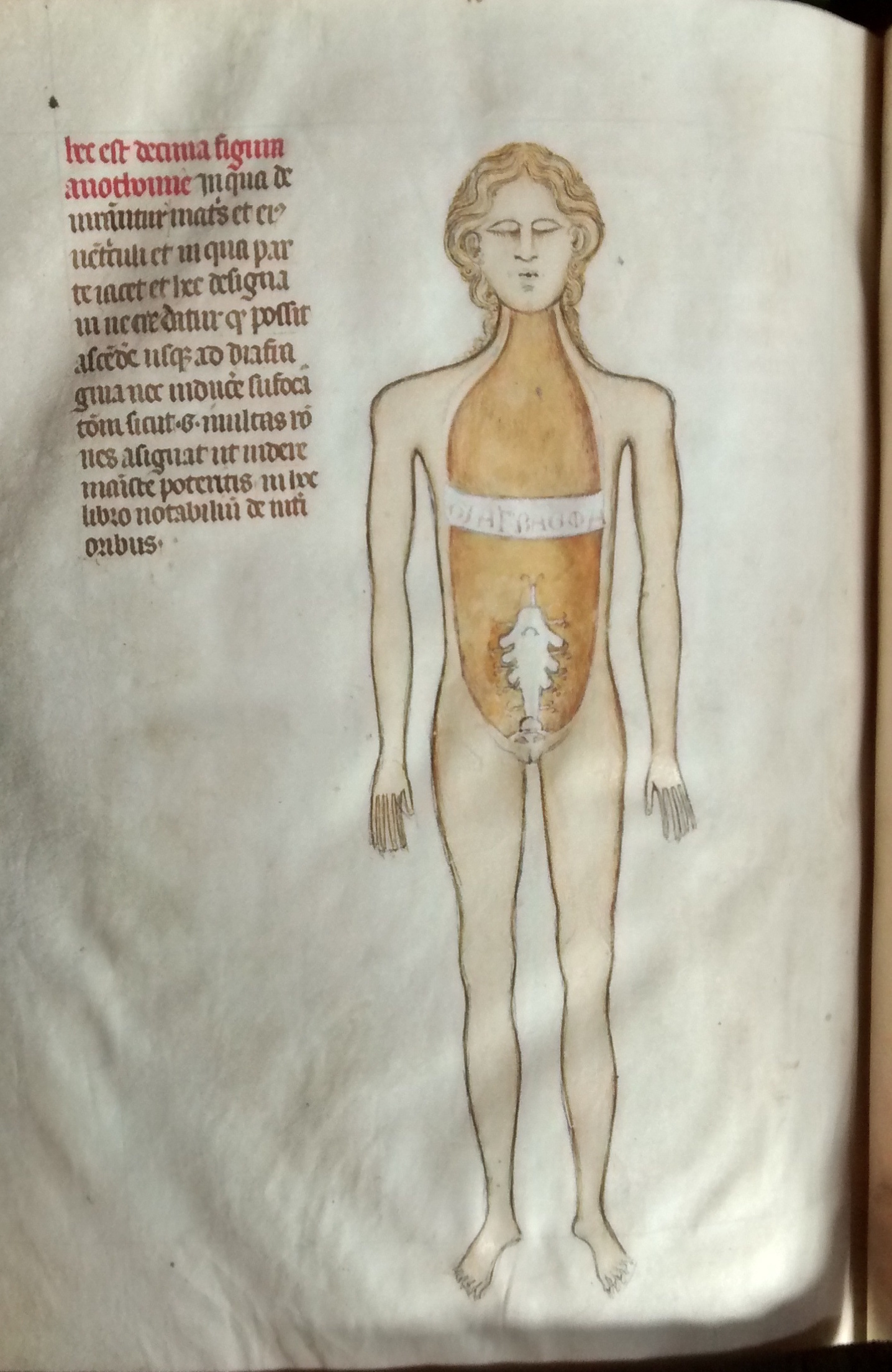
Anatomy of the uterus by Guido da Vigevano, Anothomia Philippi Septimi Chantilly, Musée Condé, Ms. 334, fol. 281v.

Guido da Vigevano or Guido da Vigevano da Pavia (born c. 1280; died c. 1349) was an Italian physician and inventor. He is notable for his sketchbook Texaurus regis Francie, a catalog of military equipment, and his Anothomia Philippi Septimi, an illustrated work on dissection. Each provides insight into the state of medieval technology and medicine. As an inventor, Guido can be regarded as a distant forerunner of later Renaissance artist-engineers like Taccola, Francesco di Giorgio Martini and Leonardo da Vinci. As an anatomist, Guido documents the practices of the fourteenth-century Bolognese school and its esteemed doctor Mondino de Luzzi.

== Life ==
Guido was born around 1280 in Pavia, but nothing is known beyond his professional life. He attended the prestigious medical college at the University of Bologna where he learned from Mondino de Luzzi, one of the most influential doctors of the late Middle Ages. After completing his education he returned to Pavia to practice medicine. In 1310 he joined the ill-fated campaign of Holy Roman Emperor Henry VII as court physician. Guido likely earned his job after surrendering the castle of Vigevano to Henry in a bloodless coup. Following the emperor's death in 1313, Guido returned to Pavia. We know that during those years, Guido lived and practiced his profession in Pavia, actively participating in the city's political life. In 1318, the podestà of Pavia, Luchino Visconti, granted him the contract for the collection of certain taxes, and in 1320, he received sums from the municipality. In 1323, he appeared on the lists of Pavia's citizens who supported Matteo Visconti and were summoned to appear before the papal inquisitors. Condemned in absentia, he left Pavia, while some of his family members, possibly including magister Baldassarre da Vigevano—who may have been his brother—probably remained in the city. There are no further confirmed records of him until 1335.

Vigevano fled north to France and found employment as physician to Queen Jeanne of Burgundy and later to her husband King Philippe VI. Court records reveal that Guido received payments for both medical and diplomatic services. The last record of Guido appears in 1349 and it is widely assumed that he died a year later in the plague of 1350.

== Works ==
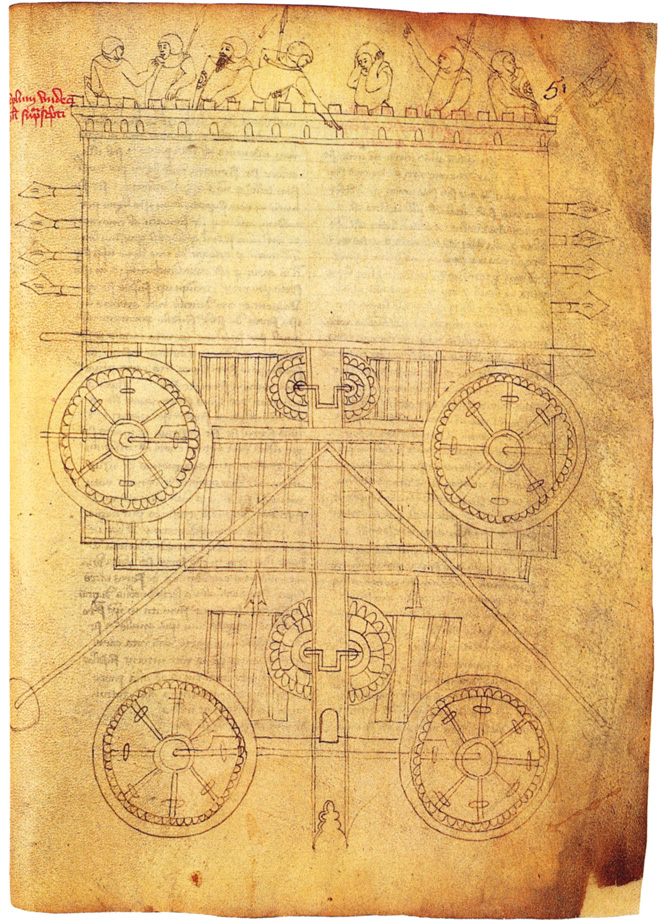
Guido da Vigevanos sketch of a crank wagon, Bibliothèque Nationale de France, Paris

Vigevano is best known for his medical and technological treatises. In 1335 he authored the Texarus regis francie. In support of a crusade pledged by Philippe VI. The work contains plentiful drawings of war machines and vehicles, including armored chariots, wind-propelled carriages, and other imaginative siege equipment. The work was likely inspired by late antique military writings such as the Epitoma rei militaris of Vegetius and technical adaptations made by Milanese siege engineers. Philippe's crusade was never realized because of war with England, but his military sketchbook is a notable example of the experimental nature of medieval war engineering.

Guido wrote two medical works: a regimen sanitatis or health manual to accompany Philippe on his crusade, and a treatise on dissection named the Anothomia Philipi Septimi, which he also dedicated to the French king. The regimen follows a genre of personal health guides best known in works like the Regimen sanitatis Salernitanum. Guido tailored his regimin to give advice on maintaining health while traveling in eastern Mediterranean climates. A special antidotery discusses poisons used in assassinations and gives the king advice on purgatives and antidotes. In one section, Guido describes testing an antidote of his own creation against Anconitum (wolfsbane). After poisoning himself with the plant, he writes that he ate a mash made from larva which had fed on Aconitum flowers and successfully recovered.

The Anothomia Philippi Septimi is a work on dissection created in 1345. It follows the approach used by Guido's mentor Mondino de Luzzi, exploring the three "venters" or regions of the human body: abdomen, chest, head. While Guido's work largely repeats the work of established authorities, he does note discrepancies in these works, for instance, the shape of the spleen.

The Anothomia is notable for its illustrations, which Guido claims, record his experiences with human dissection. Although forbidden in France, Guido boasted that he had dissected human bodies many times, and describes himself as an expert anatomist. His drawings echo the work of Henri de Mondeville a professor of surgery and also a court physician to the French crown, but are more detailed and naturalistic. A drawing of a female cadaver is especially notable as a rare illustration of the so-called "seven chambered" uterus hypothesized by a Pseudo-Galenic text titled De Spermate spuriously attributed to Galen of Pergamon.

== See also ==
- Villard de Honnecourt
