= Treadwheel =

Form of engine typically powered by humans

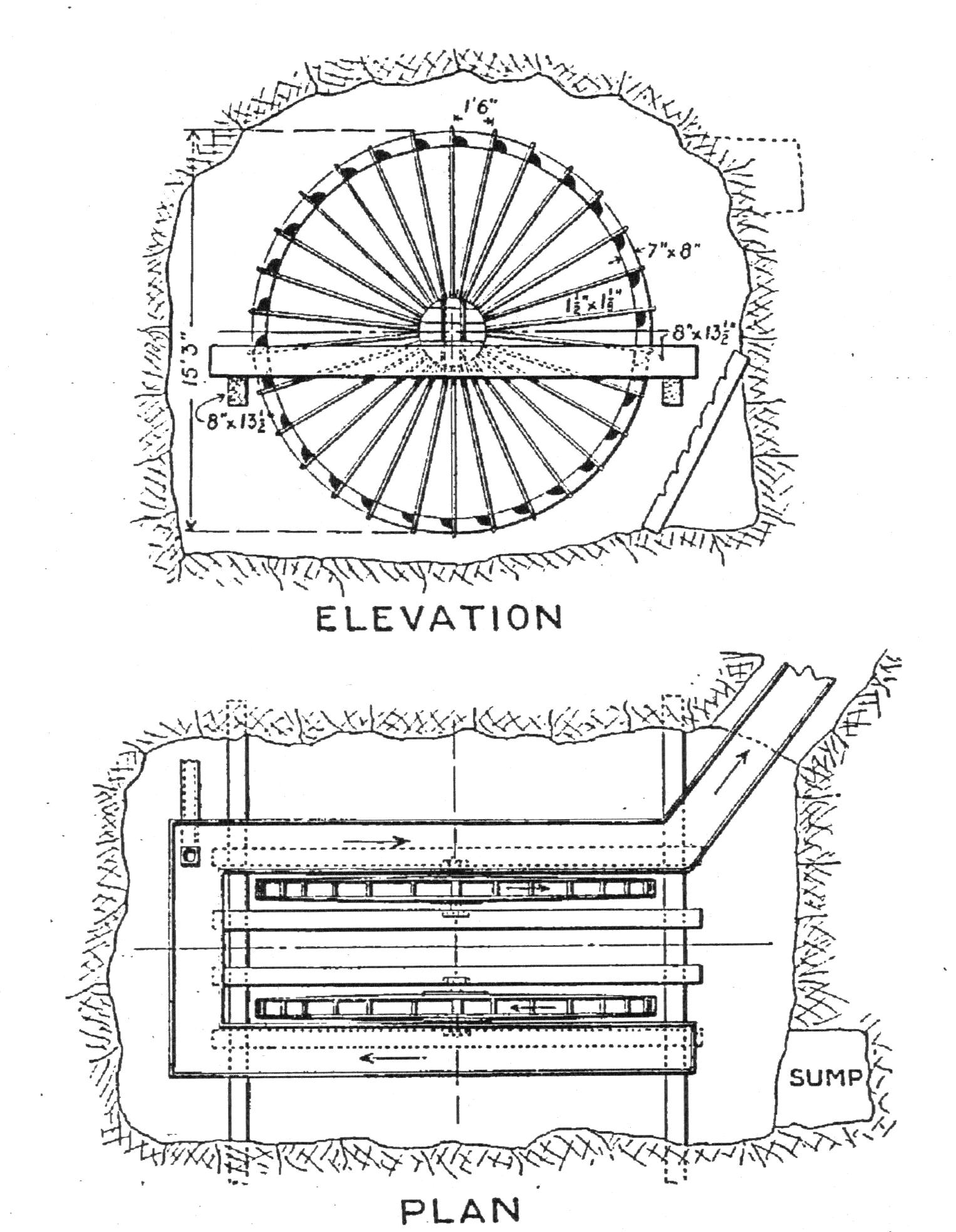
Roman drainage treadwheel from Rio Tinto mines, Spain

A treadwheel, or treadmill, is a form of engine typically powered by humans. It may resemble a water wheel in appearance, and can be worked either by a human treading paddles set into its circumference (treadmill), or by a human or animal standing inside it (treadwheel). These devices are no longer used for power or punishment, and the term "treadmill" has come to mean an exercise machine for running, walking or other exercises in place.

== History ==
Uses of treadwheels included raising water, to power cranes, or grind grain. They were used extensively in the Greek and Roman world, such as in the reverse overshot water-wheel used for dewatering purposes. They were widely used in the Middle Ages to lift the stones in the construction of Gothic cathedrals. There is a literary reference to one in 1225, and one treadwheel crane survives at Chesterfield, Derbyshire and is housed in the Museum. It has been dated to the early 14th century and was housed in the top of the church tower until its removal in 1947. They were used extensively in the Renaissance famously by Brunelleschi during the construction of Florence cathedral.

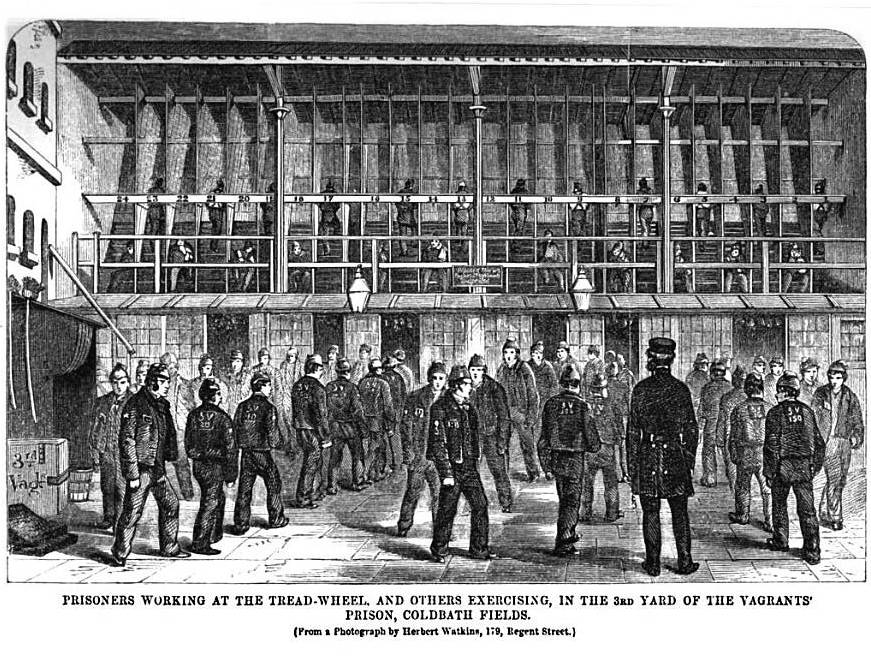
British penal treadmill

Penal treadmills were used in prisons during the early Victorian period in the UK as a form of punishment. According to The Times in 1827, and reprinted in William Hone's Table-Book in 1838, the amount prisoners walked per day on average varied, from the equivalent of 6,600 vertical feet at Lewes to as much as 17,000 vertical feet in ten hours during the summertime at Warwick gaol. In 1902, the British government banned the use of the treadwheel as a form of punishment.

== See also ==
- Chain pump
- The Experiment, a horse-powered boat
- Horse mill
- List of historical harbour cranes
- Treadwheel crane
