= Jerash =

City in Jerash Governorate, Jordan

Jerash جرش Gerasa
- City
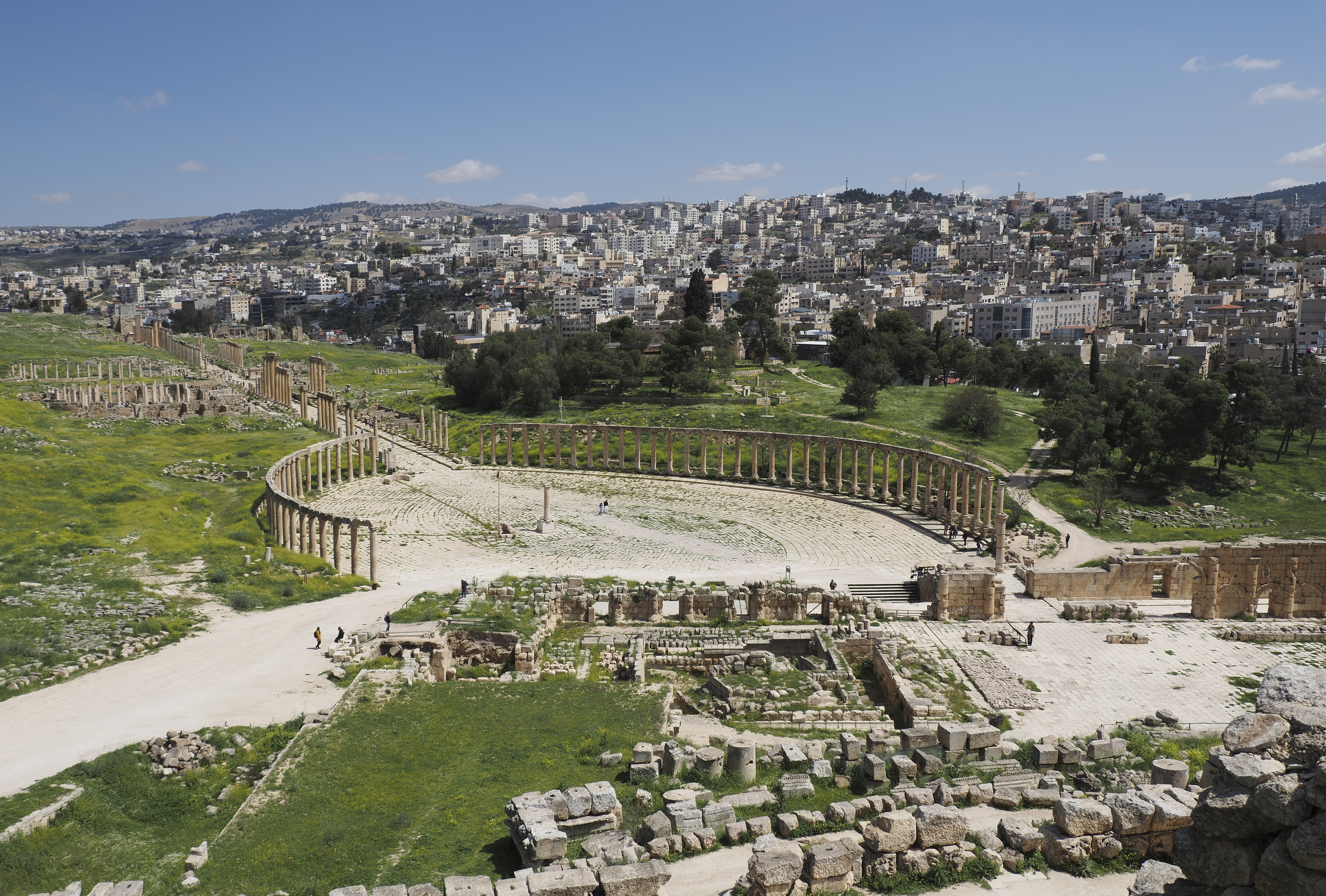
- The Greco-Roman city of Gerasa and the modern Jerash in the background.
- Nicknames: Pompeii of the East; The city of 1000 columns
- Location within Jordan
- Coordinates: 32°16′50″N 35°53′50″E
- Grid position: 234/187
- Country: Jordan
- Governorate: Jerash Governorate
- Founded: 7500 – 5500 BC
- Municipality established: 1910

Government
  - Type: Municipality
- Elevation: 600 m (2,000 ft)

Population (2015)
  - Total: city (50,745) Municipality (237,000 est)
- Time zone: GMT +2
  - Summer (DST): +3
- Area code: +(962)2
- Website: www.jerash.gov.jo

Jerash or Jarash (Arabic: جرش, romanized: Ǧaraš [dʒaraʃ]; Greek: Γέρασα, romanized: Gérasa, Koine Greek pronunciation: [ˈɡerasa]) is a city in northern Jordan. The city is the administrative center of the Jerash Governorate, and has a population of 50,745 as of 2015. It is located 30.0 miles (48.3 kms) north of the capital city Amman.

The earliest evidence of settlement in Jerash is in a Neolithic site known as Tal Abu Sowan, where rare human remains dating to around 7500 BC were uncovered. Jerash flourished during the Hellenistic, Roman, and Byzantine periods, when it was known as Gerasa. It was one of the cities of the Hellenistic cities of the Decapolis. It was an important city in early Christian times and its early churches, some of which were formerly temples, include notable examples of the evolution of church architecture. In the mid-eighth century the 749 Galilee earthquake destroyed large parts of it, and subsequent earthquakes contributed to additional destruction.

In 1120, Zahir ad-Din Toghtekin, atabeg of Damascus ordered a garrison of forty men to build up a fort in an unknown site of the ruins of the ancient city, likely the highest spot of the city walls in the north-eastern hills. It was captured in 1121 by Baldwin II, King of Jerusalem, and utterly destroyed. The Crusaders immediately abandoned Jerash and withdrew to Sakib (Seecip); the eastern border of the settlement.

Jerash was then deserted and reappeared in the historical record at the beginning of Ottoman rule in the area during the early 16th century. In the census of 1596, it had a population of 12 Muslim households. However, archaeologists found a small Mamluk hamlet in the Northwest Quarter which indicates that Jerash was resettled before the Ottoman era. The excavations conducted since 2011 have shed light on the Middle Islamic period as recent discoveries have uncovered a large concentration of Middle Islamic/Mamluk structures and pottery. The ancient city has been gradually revealed through a series of excavations since 1925.

Jerash today is home to one of the best preserved Greco-Roman cities, which earned it the nickname "Pompeii of the Middle East".

In 2025, the findings of a mass grave excavated in Jerash attest archaeologically and genetically to the presence of the Plague of Justinian in this region of the world.

Approximately 330,000 visitors arrived in Jerash in 2018, making it one of the most visited sites in Jordan. The city hosts the Jerash Festival, one of the leading cultural events in the Middle East that attracts tens of thousands of visitors every year.

== History ==
=== Neolithic age ===
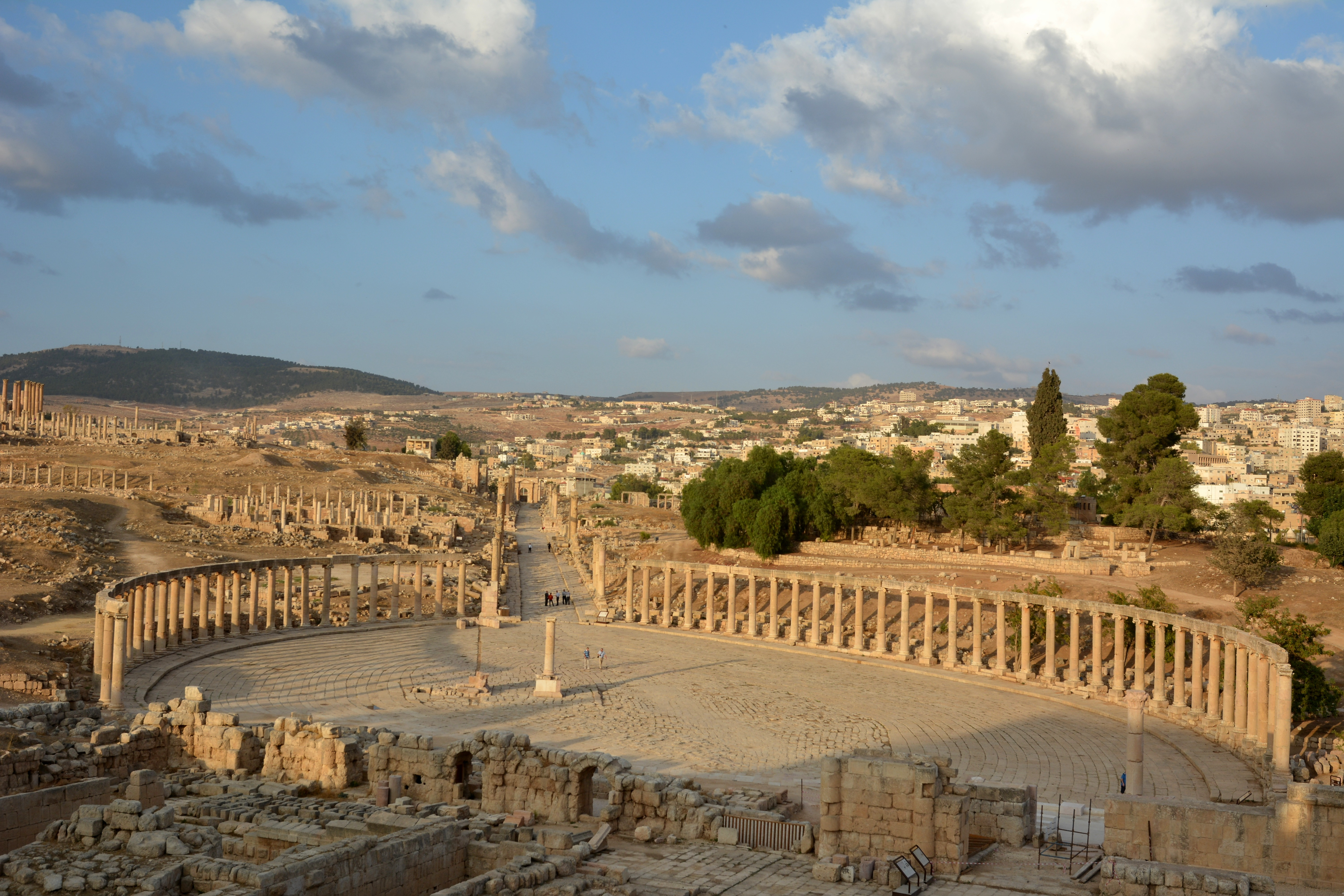
The Oval Forum and Cardo Maximus in ancient Jerash

Archaeologists have found ruins of settlements dating back to the Neolithic Age. Moreover, in August 2015, an archaeological excavation team from the University of Jordan unearthed two human skulls that date back to the Neolithic period (7500–5500 BC) at a site in Jerash. This forms solid evidence of inhabitance of Jordan in that period, especially in connection with the existence of 'Ain Ghazal Neolithic settlement in Amman. The importance of the discovery lies in the rarity of the skulls, as archaeologists estimate that a maximum of 12 sites across the world contain similar human remains.

=== Bronze Age ===
Evidence of settlements dating to the Bronze Age (3200–1200 BC) have been found in the region.

=== Hellenistic period ===
Jerash is the site of the ruins of the Greek city of Gerasa, also referred to as Antioch on the Golden River. Ancient Greek inscriptions from the city support that the city was founded by Alexander the Great and his general Perdiccas, who allegedly settled aged Macedonian soldiers there during the spring of 331 BC, when he left Egypt and crossed Syria en route to Mesopotamia. However, other sources, namely the city's former name of "Antioch on the Chrysorrhoas," point to a founding by Seleucid King Antioch IV, while still others attribute the founding to Ptolemy II of Egypt.

In the early 80s BC Hasmonean King Alexander Jannaeus besieged and conquered Gerasa, incorporating it into the Kingdom of Judea. Archeological findings indicate that public buildings in Gerasa may have been destroyed during that period.

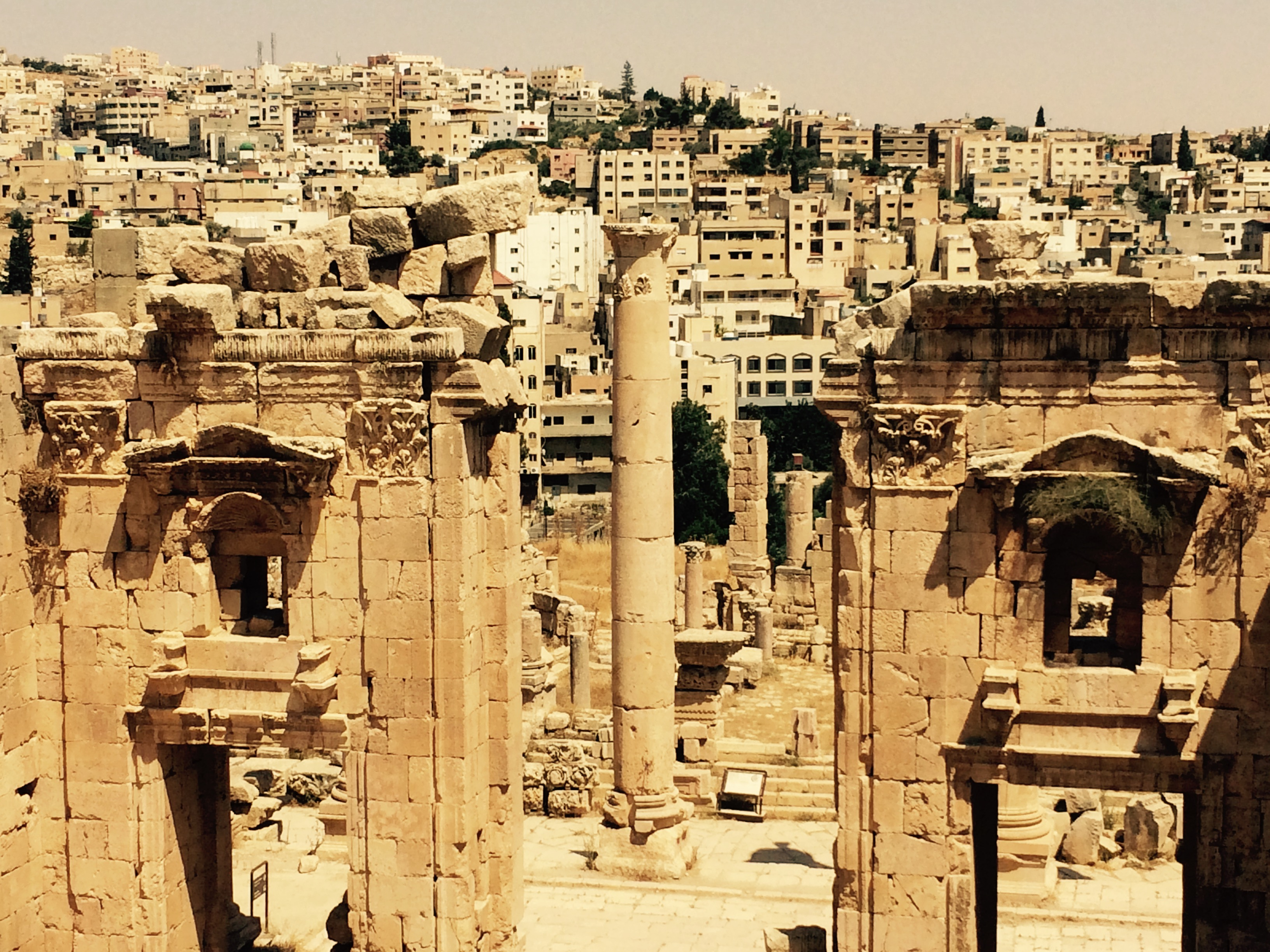
Ancient Jerash against the backdrop of the modern city

=== Roman period ===
Colonnaded Street

With the Roman conquest of the area in 63 BC, the short-lived Jewish rule of Gerasa came to an end. Pompey attached the city to the Decapolis, a league of Hellenistic cities that enjoyed considerable autonomy under Roman protection. The historian Josephus mentions the city as being principally inhabited by Syrians, and also having a small Jewish community. During the First Jewish–Roman War, Gerasa was among the few non-Jewish cities in the region not to kill or imprison its Jewish residents, and its residents even escorted any Jews who wanted to leave to the border.

Gerasa was the birthplace of the mathematician Nicomachus of Gerasa (Greek: Νικόμαχος) (c. 60 – c. 120 AD). It has been proposed to identify it as Geresh, a place mentioned by Josephus as the birthplace of Jewish Zealot leader Simon bar Giora, but other scholars identify it with modern-day Jurish.

In the second half of the 1st century AD, the city of Gerasa achieved great prosperity. In AD 106, Geras was absorbed into the Roman province of Arabia, which included the cities of Philadelphia (modern day Amman), Petra and Bostra. The Romans ensured security and peace in this area, which enabled its people to devote their efforts and time to economic development and encouraged civic building activity. Emperor Trajan constructed roads throughout the province, and more trade came to Jerash. Emperor Hadrian visited Gerasa in AD 129–130, and the triumphal arch known as the Arch of Hadrian was built to celebrate this occasion.

=== Byzantine period ===
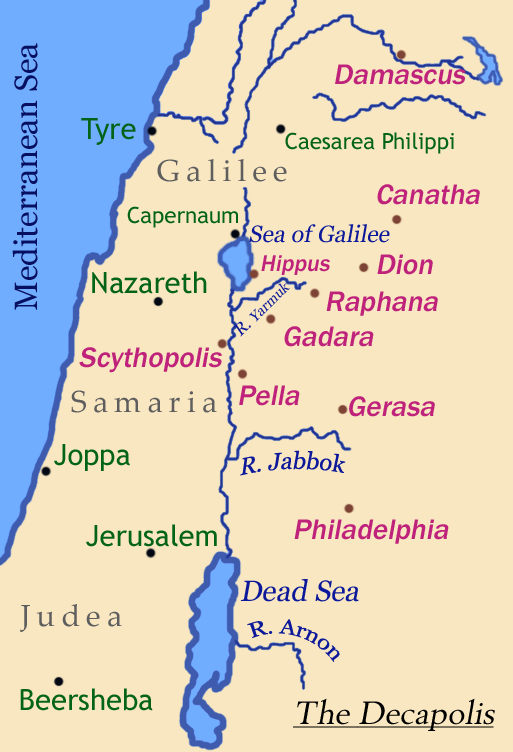
Map of the Decapolis showing the location of Gerasa (Jerash)

The city finally reached a size of about 80 ha (200 acres) within its walls. Beneath the foundations of a Byzantine church built in Gerasa in AD 530 a mosaic floor was discovered with ancient Greek and Hebrew-Aramaic inscriptions. The presence of the Hebrew-Aramaic script has led scholars to suggest that the place was a synagogue converted into a church. Gerasa was invaded by the Persian Sassanids in AD 614. In 636, the Byzantine army was defeated in the Battle of the Yarmuk by the invading Muslim forces and these territories became part of the Rashidun Caliphate.

=== Umayyad period ===
The city flourished during the Umayyad Caliphate. It had numerous shops and issued coins with the mint named "Jerash" in Arabic. It was also a centre for ceramic manufacture; molded ceramic lamps had Arabic inscriptions that showed the potter's name and Jerash as the place of manufacture. The large mosque and several churches that continued to be used as places of worship, indicated that during the Umayyad period Jerash had a sizable Muslim community that co-existed with the Christians. In 749, a devastating earthquake destroyed much of Jerash and its surroundings.

=== Crusader period ===
In the early 12th century a fortress was built by a garrison stationed in the area by the Zahir ad-Din Toghtekin, atabeg of Damascus. Baldwin II, King of Jerusalem, captured and burned the fortress in 1121–1122. Although the site of the fortification has often been identified with the ruins of the temple of Artemis, there is no evidence of the construction of a fortification in the temple in the 12th century. The location of this fort is probably to be found at the highest point of the city walls, in the north-eastern hills.

=== Mid to Late Muslim period ===
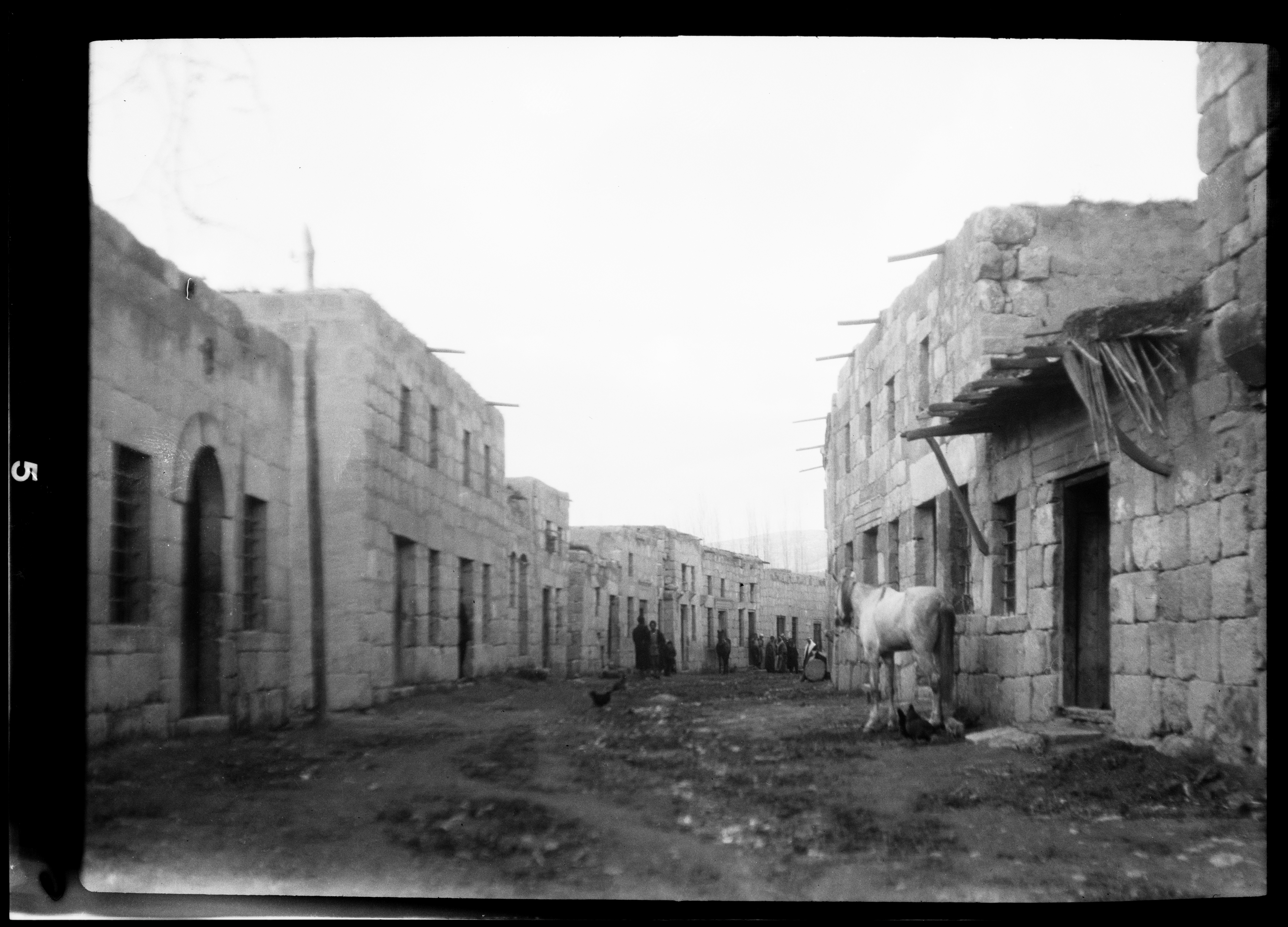
Jerash town in 1922, by Frank Scholten

Small settlements continued in Jerash during the Mamluk Sultanate, and Ottoman periods. This occurred particularly in the Northwest Quarter and around the Temple of Zeus, where several Islamic Mamluk domestic structures have now been excavated.

In 1596, during the Ottoman era, Jerash was noted in the census as Jaras, being located in the nahiya of Bani Ilwan in the liwa of Ajloun. It had a population of 12 Muslim households. They paid a fixed tax-rate of 25% on various agricultural products, including wheat, barley, olive trees/fruit trees, goats and beehives, in addition to occasional revenues and a press for olive oil/grape syrup; a total of 6,000 akçe.

In 1838 Jerash was described as a ruin.

== Climate ==
Jerash has a hot-summer Mediterranean climate (Köppen climate classification Csa).

Climate data for Jerash, Jordan (648M)
Month	Jan	Feb	Mar	Apr	May	Jun	Jul	Aug	Sep	Oct	Nov	Dec	Year
Mean daily maximum °C (°F)	12.9 (55.2)	14.3 (57.7)	17.2 (63.0)	22.2 (72.0)	27.3 (81.1)	30.2 (86.4)	31.3 (88.3)	31.4 (88.5)	30.0 (86.0)	26.7 (80.1)	21 (70)	14.7 (58.5)	23.3 (73.9)
Mean daily minimum °C (°F)	4.1 (39.4)	4.8 (40.6)	6.6 (43.9)	10.1 (50.2)	14 (57)	16.9 (62.4)	18.7 (65.7)	19.1 (66.4)	17.2 (63.0)	14 (57)	9.5 (49.1)	5.6 (42.1)	11.72 (53.10)
Average precipitation mm (inches)	92 (3.6)	91 (3.6)	66 (2.6)	19 (0.7)	5 (0.2)	0 (0)	0 (0)	0 (0)	0 (0)	7 (0.3)	38 (1.5)	75 (3.0)	393 (15.5)
Source: climate Data

== Archaeology ==
Jerash is considered one of the largest and most well-preserved sites of Greek and Roman architecture in the world outside Italy.

=== Greco-Roman period ===
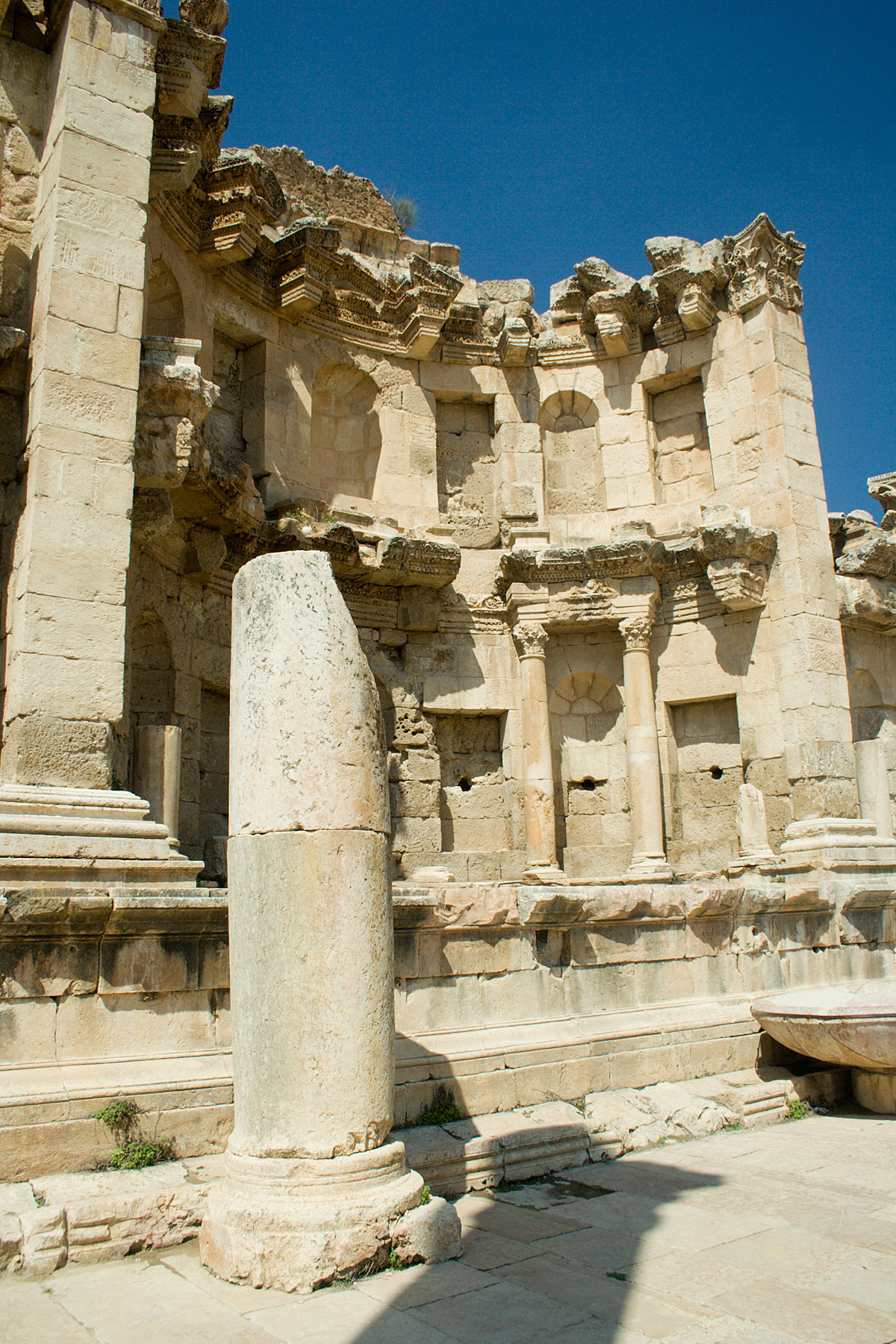
The Jerash nymphaeum.

Remains in the Greco-Roman Gerasa include:

- Oval forum 300 feet long surrounded by an Ionic colonnade
- Two large sanctuaries dedicated to Artemis and Zeus with well preserved temples
- Two theatres (the South Theatre and the North Theatre)
- The long colonnaded street or cardo and its side streets or decumani
- Two tetrapyla of Jerash, one at the intersection of northern-decumanus and cardo maximus and the other at the intersection of southern-Decumanus and cardo maximus
- Arch of Hadrian
- The circus / hippodrome
- Two major thermae (communal baths complexes)
- A large nymphaeum fed by an aqueduct
- A macellum or porticoed market
- A trapezoidal plaza delimited by two open-exedra buildings
- An almost complete circuit of city walls
- Two large bridges across the nearby river
- An extramural sanctuary with large pools and a small theatre.

Most of these monuments were built by donations of the city's wealthy citizens. The south theatre has a focus in the center of the pit in front of the stage, marked by a distinct stone, and from which normal speaking can be heard easily throughout the auditorium. In 2018, at least 14 marble sculptures were discovered in the excavation of the Eastern Baths of Gerasa, including images of Aphrodite and Zeus.

=== Late Roman and Early Byzantine period ===
A large Christian community lived in Jerash. A large cathedral was built in the city in the 4th century, the first of at least 14 churches built between the 4th and the 7th-century, many with superb mosaic floors. The supposed sawmill of Gerasa is well described in the Visitors Centre. The use of water power to saw wood or stone is well known in the Roman world: the invention occurred in the 3rd century BC. They converted the rotary movement from the mill into a linear motion using a crankshaft; good examples are known also from Hierapolis and Ephesus.

A mass grave of around 230 people who had been killed during the Plague of Justinian was uncovered in Jerash by archaeologists in 2025. According to the research team, it is the first confirmed mass grave associated with the pandemic that has been found in the eastern Mediterranean.

== Archaeological museums ==
The archaeological site of Jerash has two museums in which are displayed archaeological materials and corresponding information about the site and its rich history. The Jerash Archaeological Museum, which is the older of the two museums, is found on top of the mound known as "Camp Hill" just east of the Cardo and overlooking the Oval Plaza. The small museum contains a chronological display of artifacts found in and around Jerash from prehistoric to Islamic times. The museum displays a unique group of small statues of a group identified as the Muses of the Olympic pantheon which were discovered at Jerash in 2016. The statues, which are Roman in date, were found in a fragmentary condition and have been partially restored. The museum also contains a well-preserved lead sarcophagus dated to the late 4th to 5th centuries and features Christian and pagan symbolism. The museum also has a number of sculptures, altars, and mosaics displayed outside.

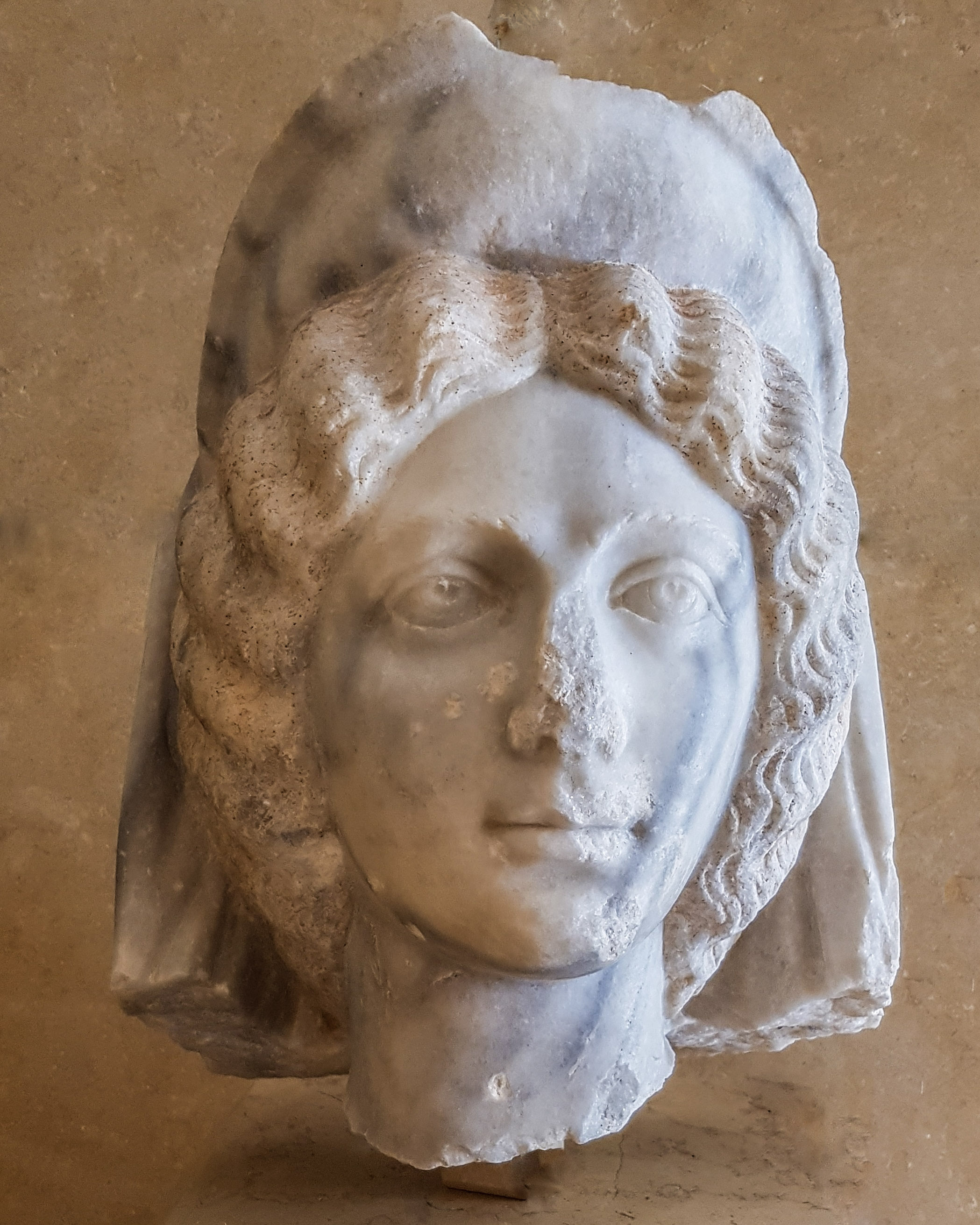
A sculpted marble head of an elite woman with a hairstyle commonly associated with Julia Domna, wife of the Roman Emperor Septimius Severus. This late 2nd/ early 3rd century head, made from marble from Turkey, was found in the 2016 excavations of the Eastern Roman Baths at Jerash, Jordan and is displayed in the Jerash Visitor Center.

The Jerash Visitor Center serves as a more recent archaeological museum, and presents the site of Jerash in a thematic approach with a focus on the evolution and development of the city of Jerash over time, as well as economy, technology, religion, and daily life. The center also displays further sculptures discovered in Jerash in 2016, including restored statues of Zeus and Aphrodite, as well as a marble head thought to represent the Roman Empress Julia Domna.

== Modern Jerash ==
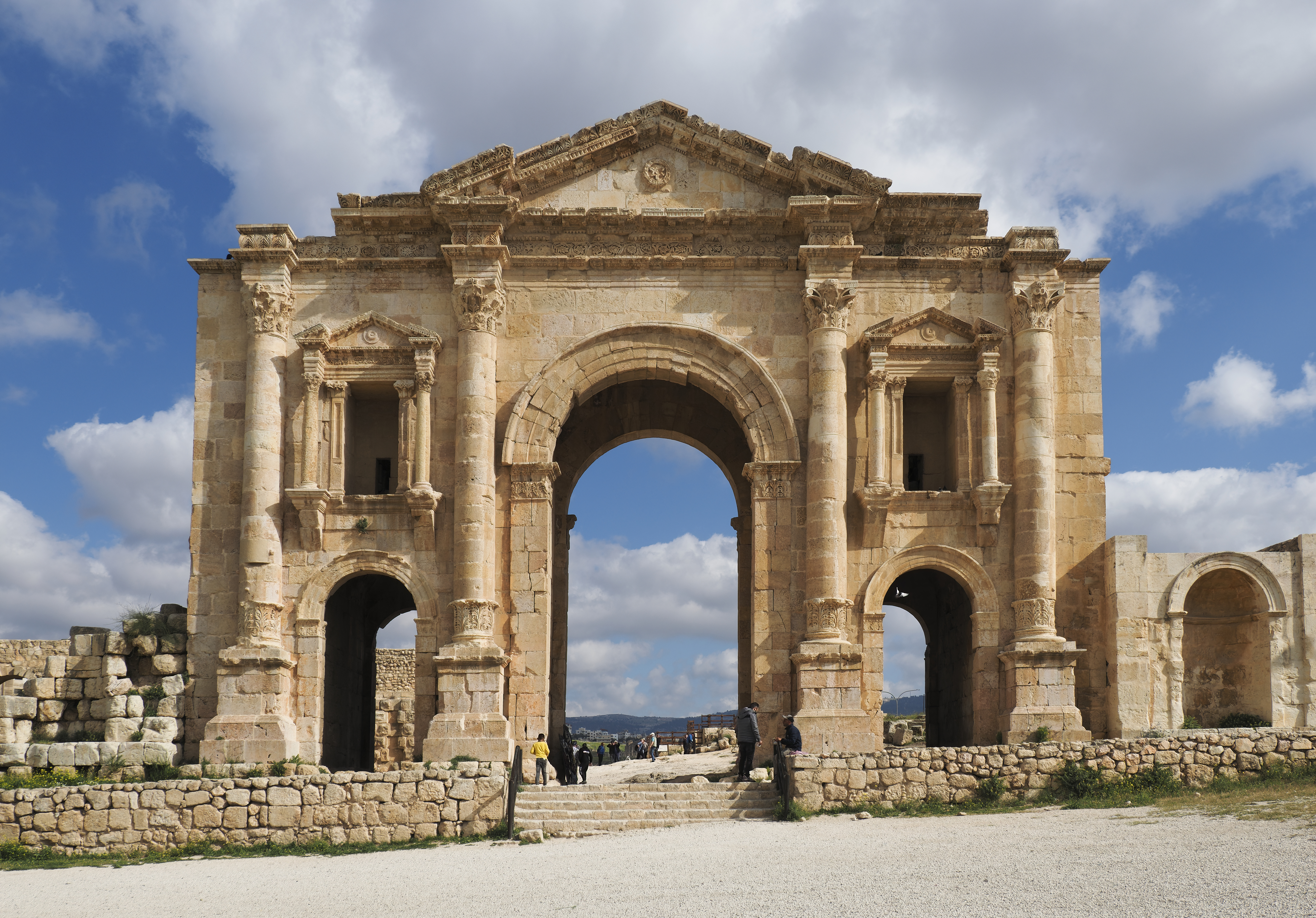
The Arch of Hadrian was built to honour the visit of Emperor Hadrian to Gerasa in 129/130 AD.

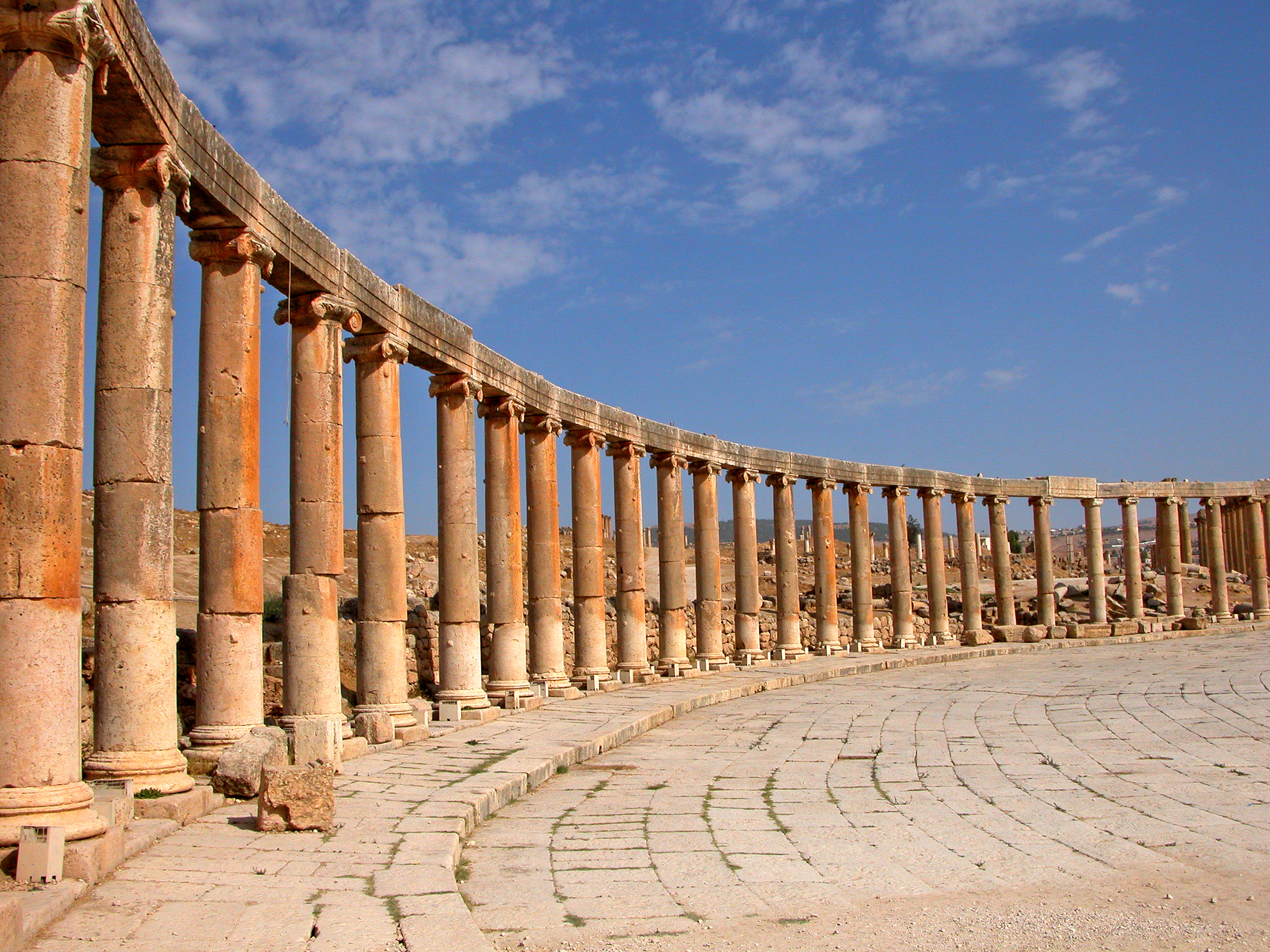
The oval Forum

Jerash has developed dramatically in the last century with the growing importance of the tourism industry in the city. Jerash is now the second-most popular tourist attraction in Jordan, closely behind the ruins of Petra. On the western side of the city, which contained most of the representative buildings, the ruins have been carefully preserved and spared from encroachment, with the modern city sprawling to the east of the river which once divided ancient Jerash in two.

=== Demographics ===
Jerash has an ethnically diverse population. The vast majority are Arabs, though the population includes small numbers of Kurds, Circassians and Armenians.

Jerash became a destination for many successive waves of foreign migrants. In 1885, the Ottoman authorities directed the Circassian immigrants who were mainly of peasant stock to settle in Jerash, and distributed arable land among them. The new immigrants have been welcomed by the local people. Later, Jerash also witnessed waves of Palestinian refugees who flowed to the region in 1948 and 1967. The Palestinian refugees settled in two camps; Souf camp near the town of Souf and Gaza (Jerash) camp at Al Ḩaddādah village.

The Jordanian census of 1961 found 3,796 inhabitants in Jerash, of whom 270 were Christians.

According to the Jordan national census of 2004, the population of the city was 31,650 and was ranked as the 14th largest municipality in Jordan. According to the last national census in 2015, the population of the city was 50,745, while the population of the governorate was 237,059.

Jerash Sports Club

Established in 1972 by the late Mr. Hisham Al- Zaghal, it served as a hub for sport, cutural and social events.

In chess, the club had a remarkable presence, winning the Kingdom Championship after defeating the Royal Chess Club in 1979. Among its most prominent players was Mr. Hisham Al-Zaghal.

== Culture and entertainment ==
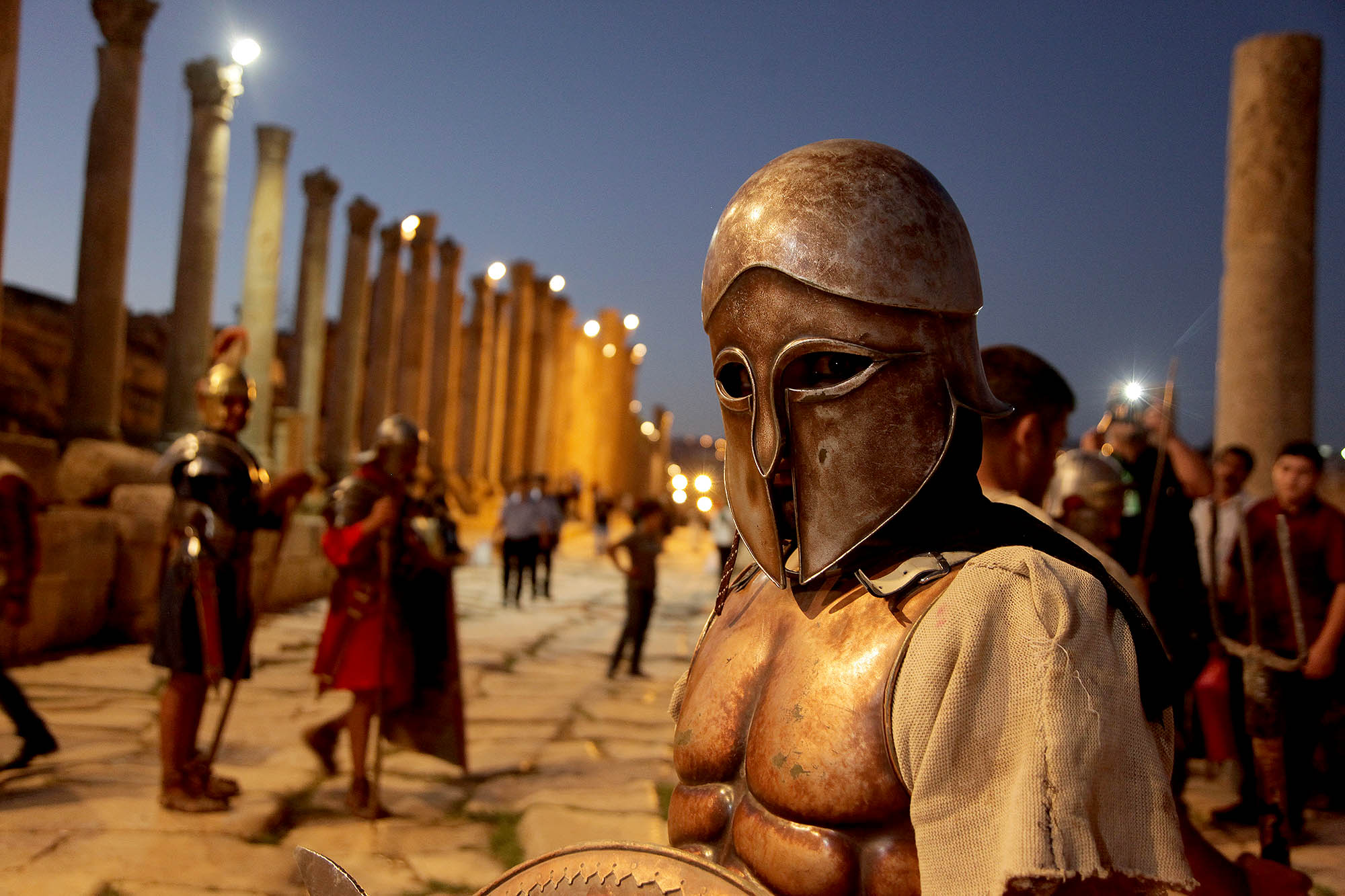
Men dressed as Roman and Greek soldiers during the Jerash Festival

Since 1981, the old city of Jerash has hosted the Jerash Festival of Culture and Arts, a three-week-long summer program of dance, music, and theatrical performances.

Performances of the Roman Army and Chariot Experience (RACE) at the hippodrome in Jerash feature forty-five legionaries in full armor in a display of Roman army drill and battle tactics, ten gladiators fighting "to the death" and several Roman chariots competing in a classical seven-lap race around the ancient hippodrome.

== Education ==
Jerash has two universities: Jerash Private University and Philadelphia University.

== Tourism ==
The number of tourists who visited the ancient city of Jerash reached 214,000 during 2005. The number of non-Jordanian tourists was 182,000 last year, and the sum of entry charges reached JD900,000. The Jerash Festival of Culture and Arts is an annual celebration of Arabic and international culture during the summer months. Jerash is located 48 km north of the capital city of Amman. The festival site is located within the ancient ruins of Jerash, some of which date to the Roman age (63 BC). The Jerash Festival is a festival which features poetry recitals, theatrical performances, concerts and other forms of art. In 2008, authorities launched the Jordan Festival, a nationwide theme-oriented event under which the Jerash Festival became a component. However, the government revived the Jerash Festival as the "substitute (Jordan Festival) proved to be not up to the message intended from the festival."

== Gallery ==
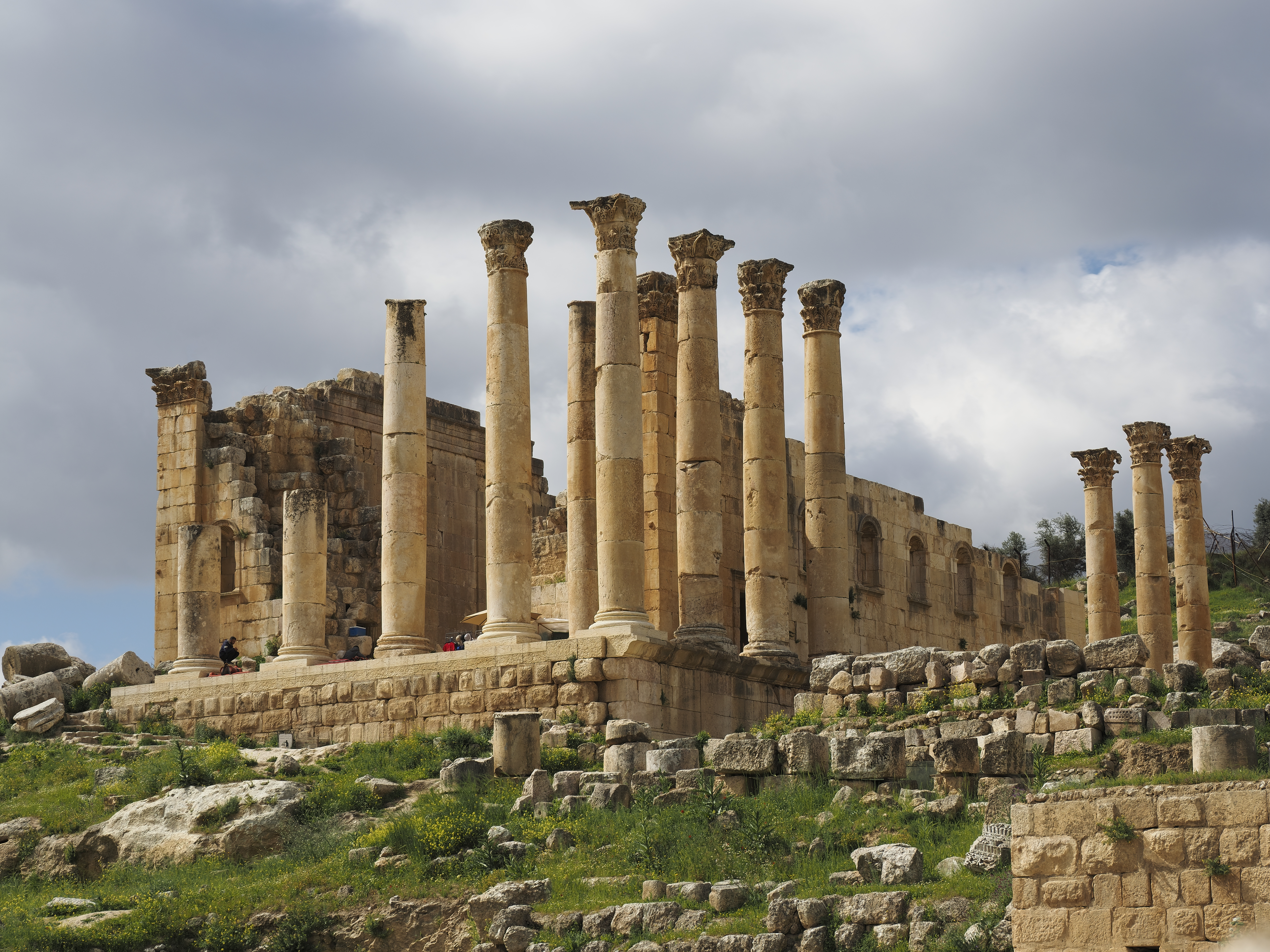
Temple of Zeus

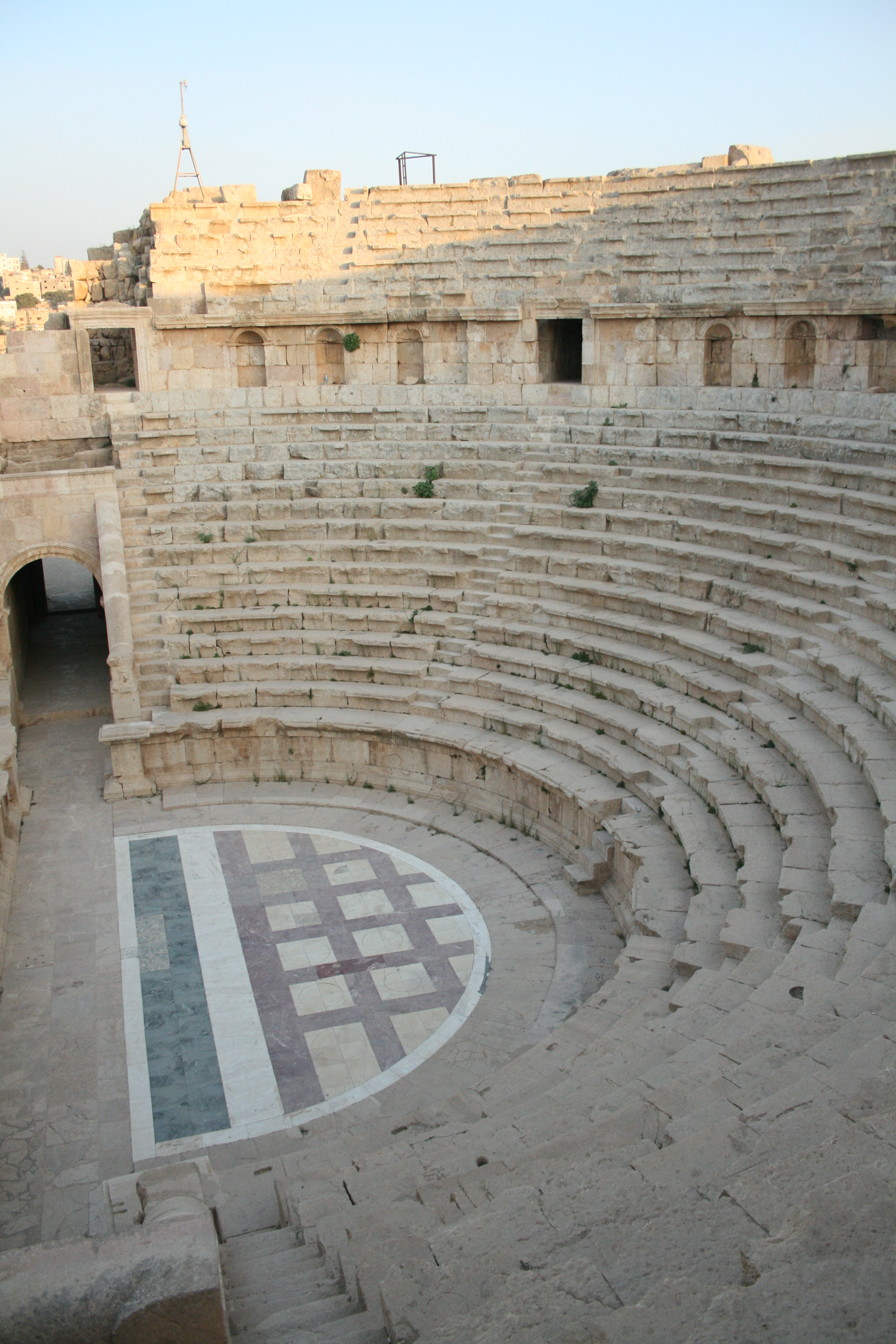
North Theater

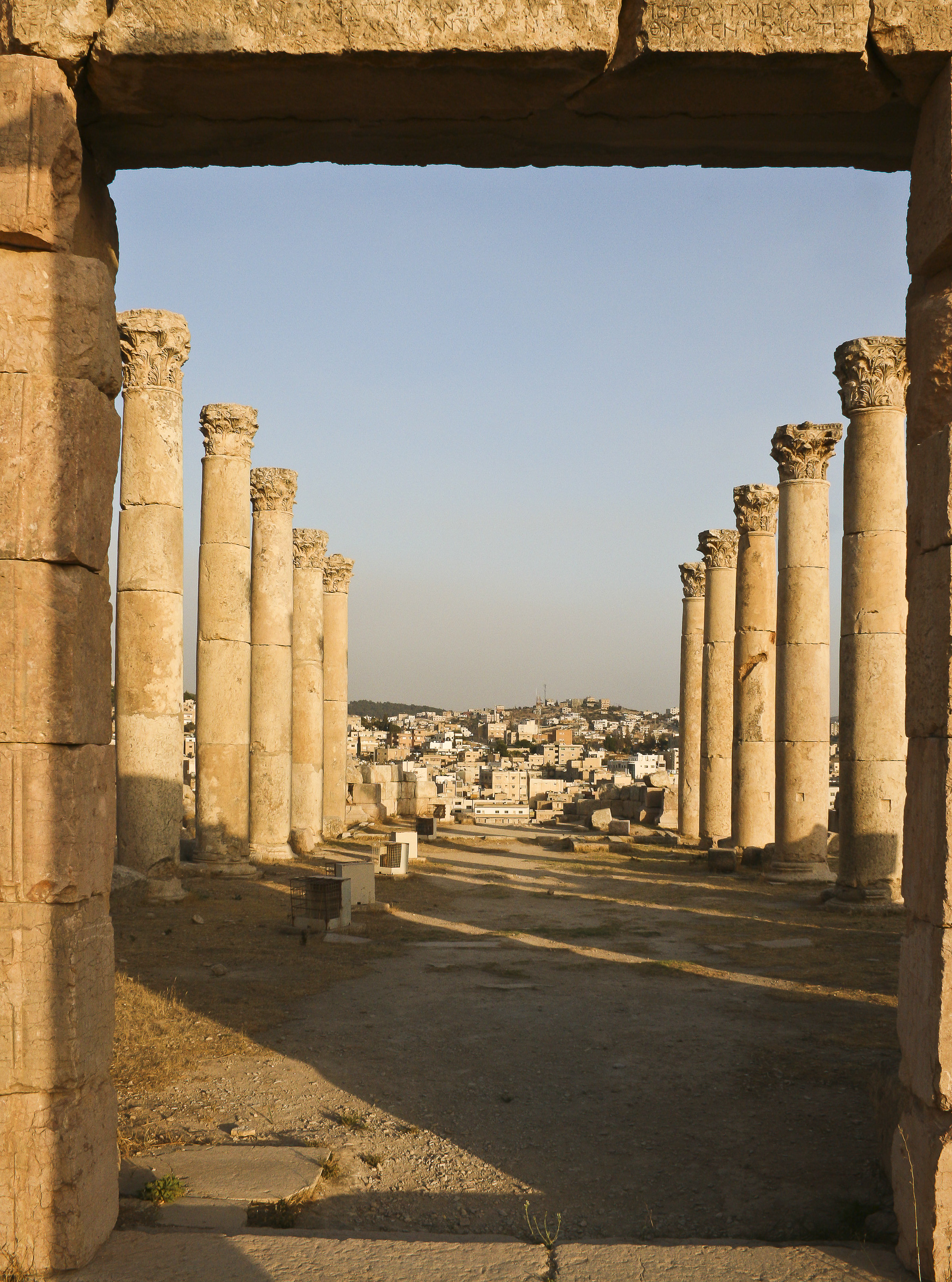
The cardo maximus

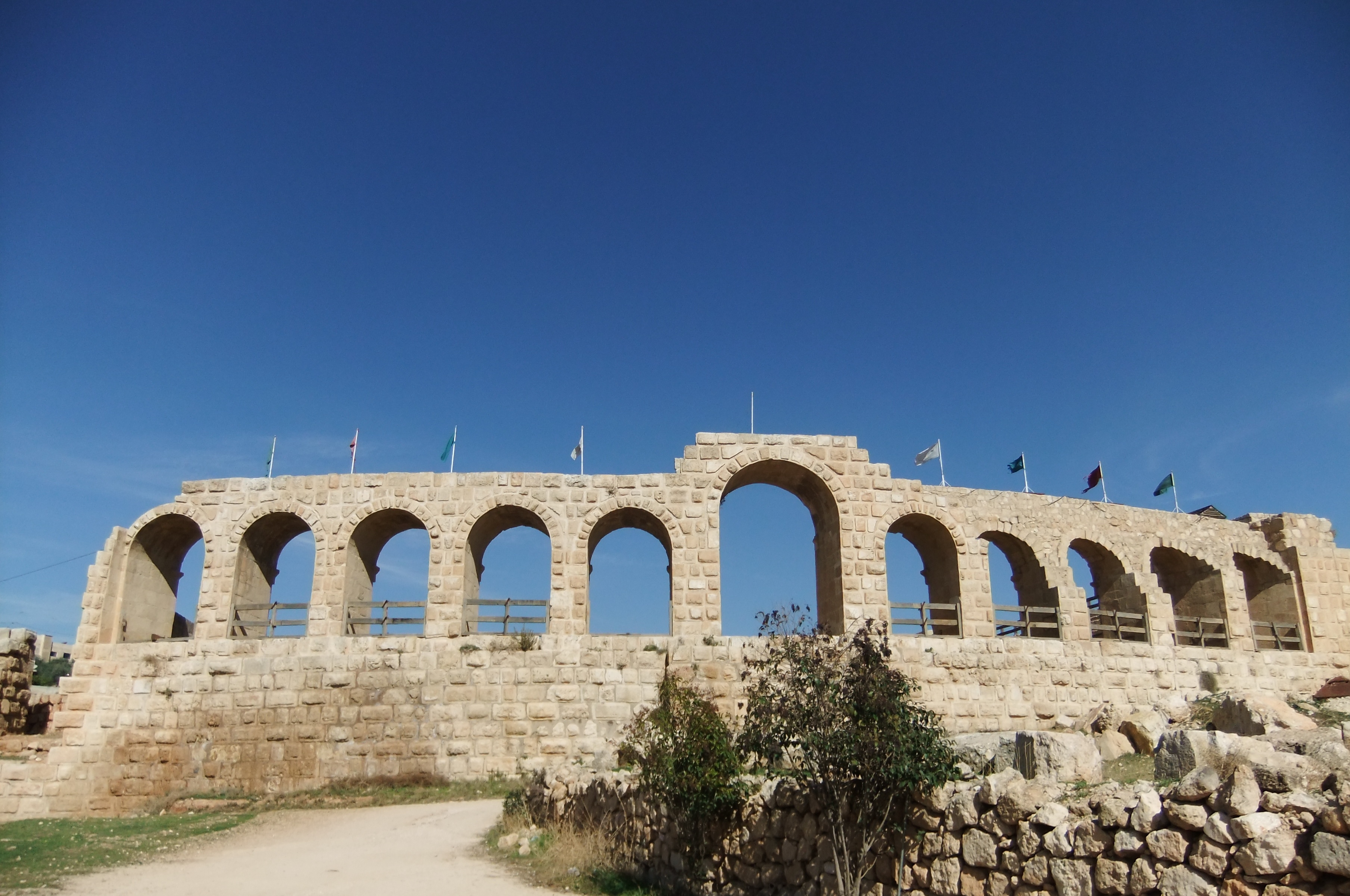
The hippodrome

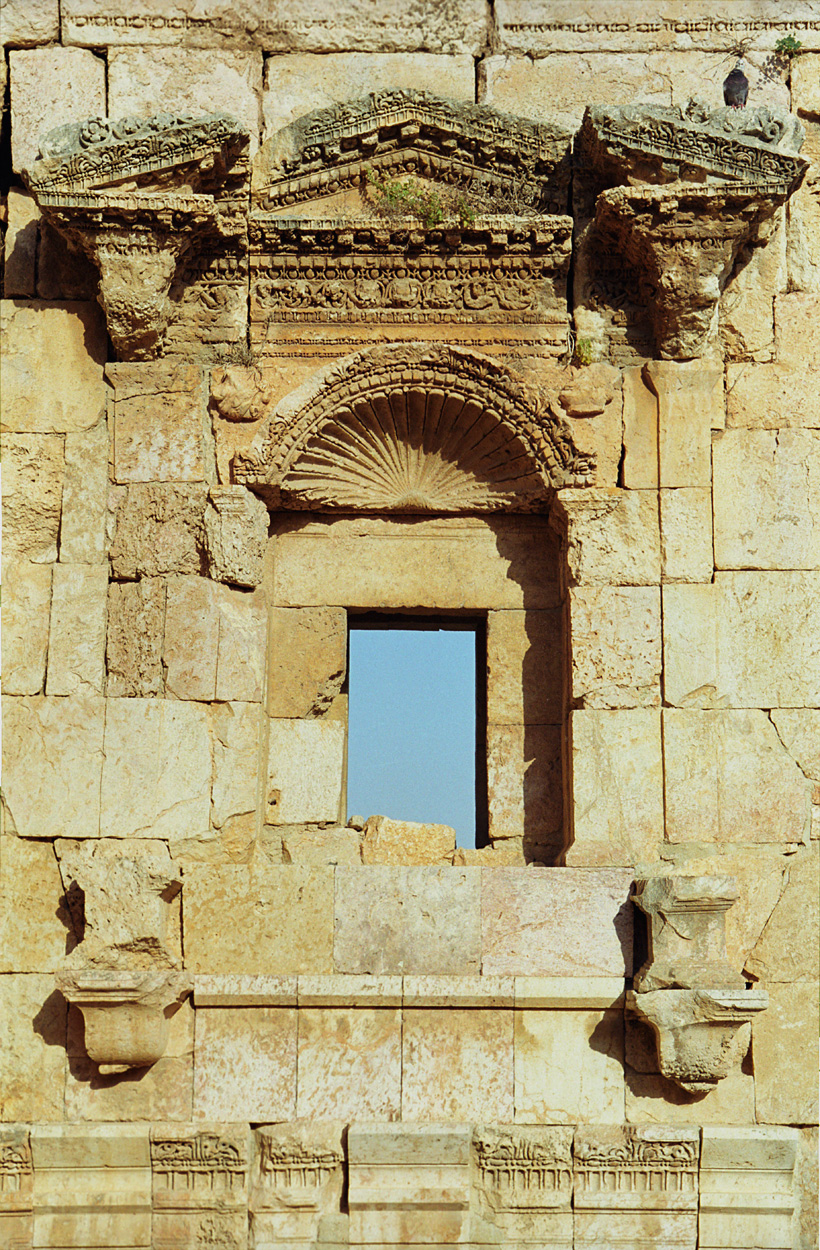
A detail of the propylaeum of Artemis

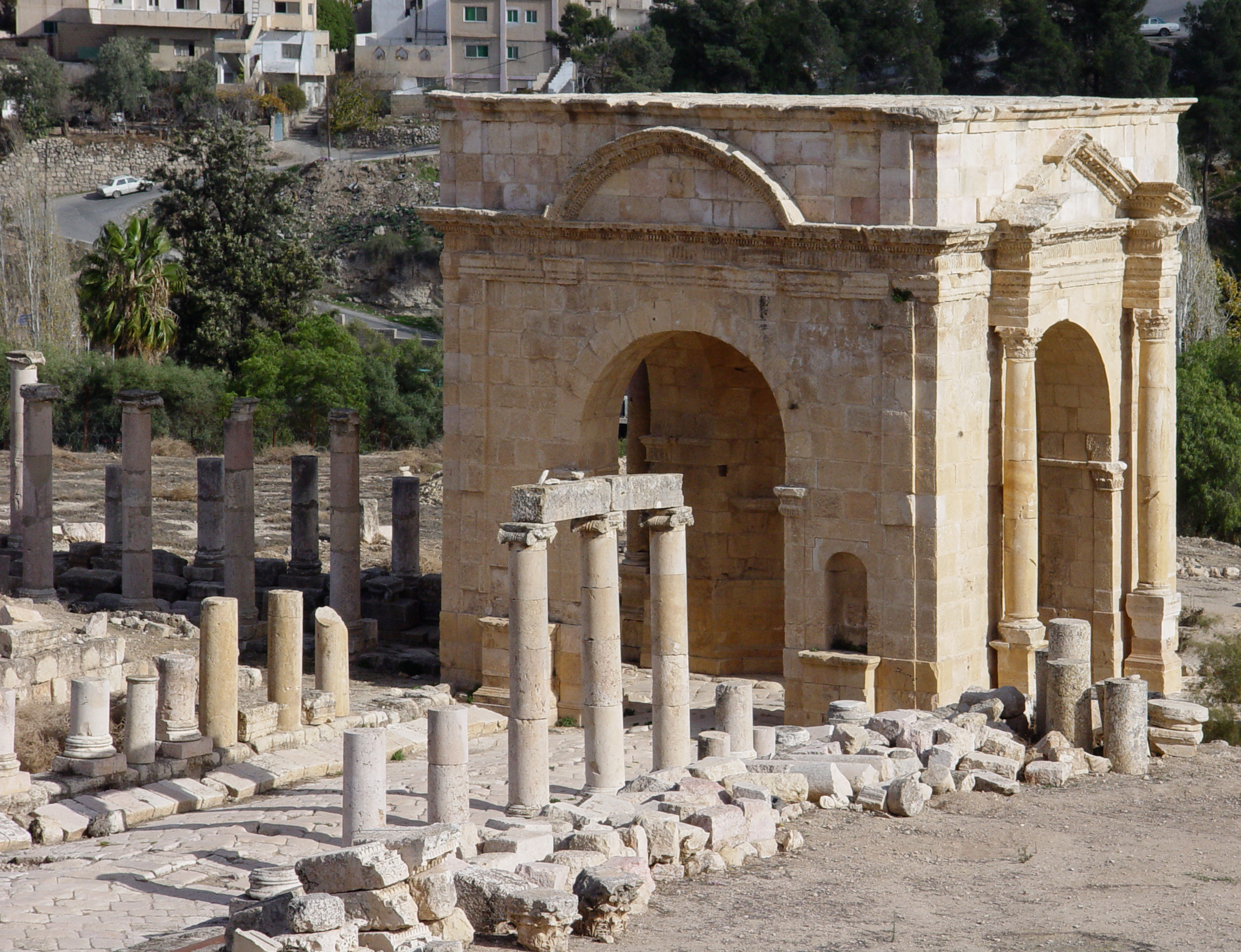
Northern Tetrapylon, Jerash

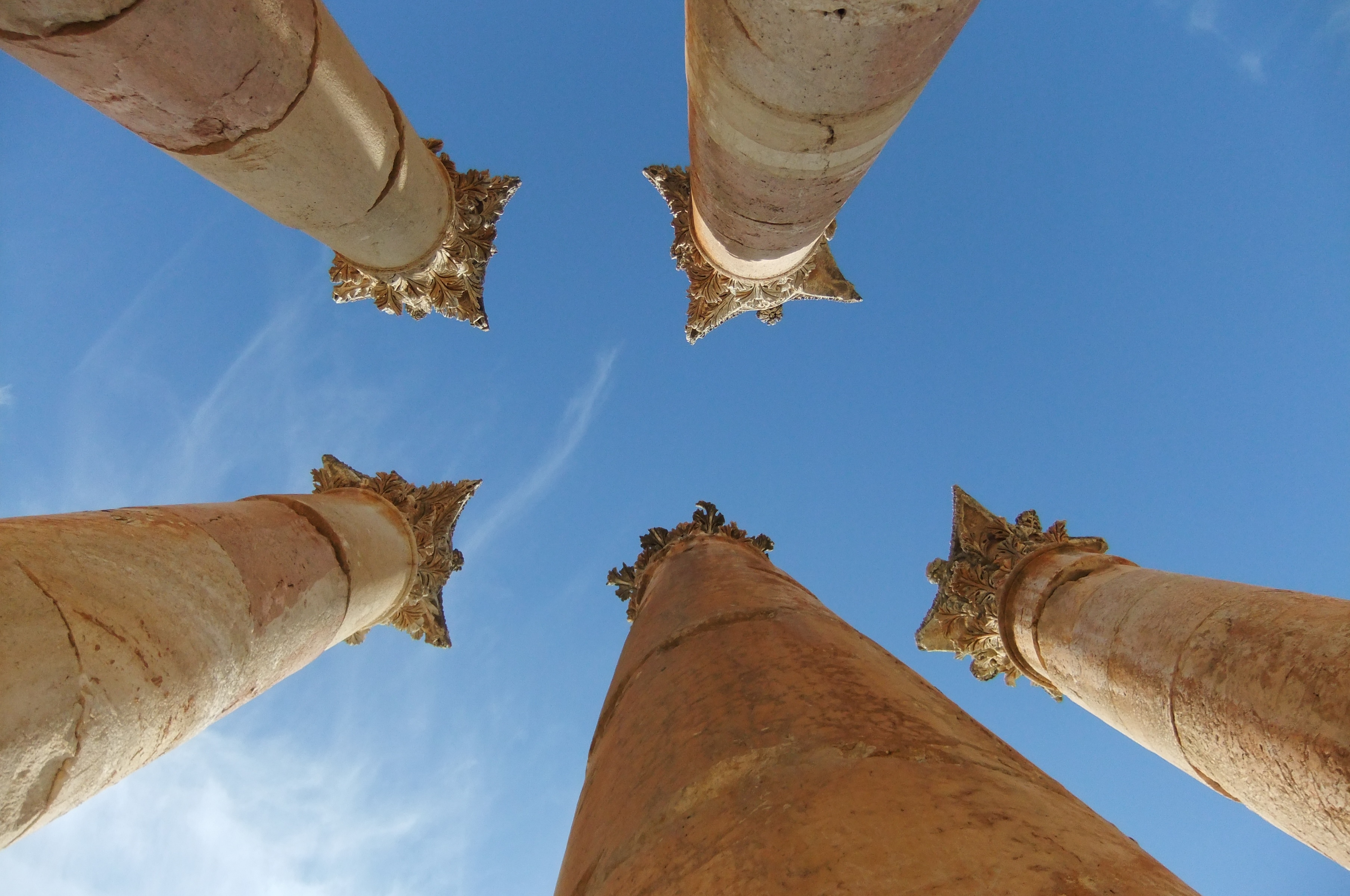
Columns of the Temple of Artemis at Jerash

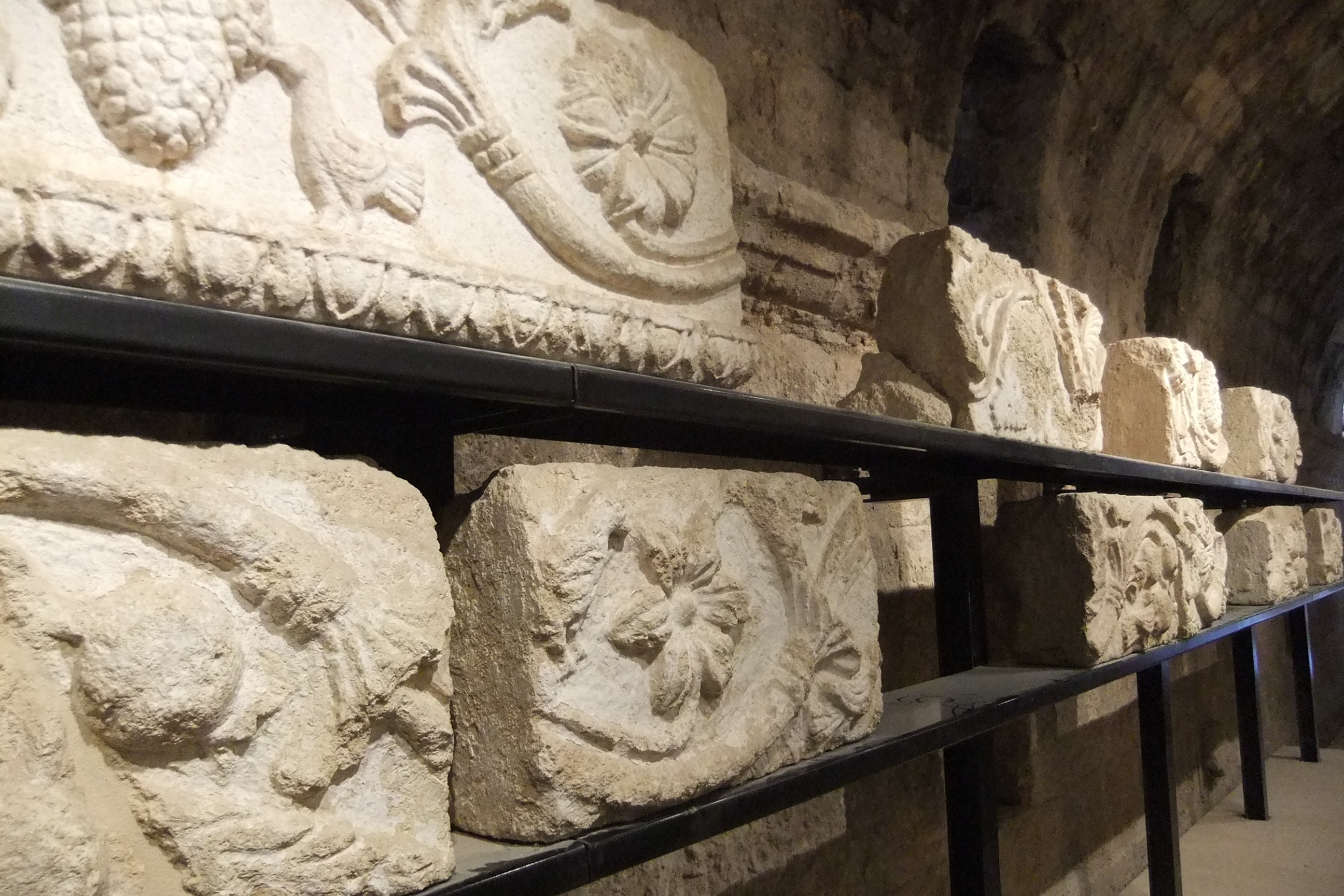
Elements of frieze from the sanctuary of Zeus at Jerash

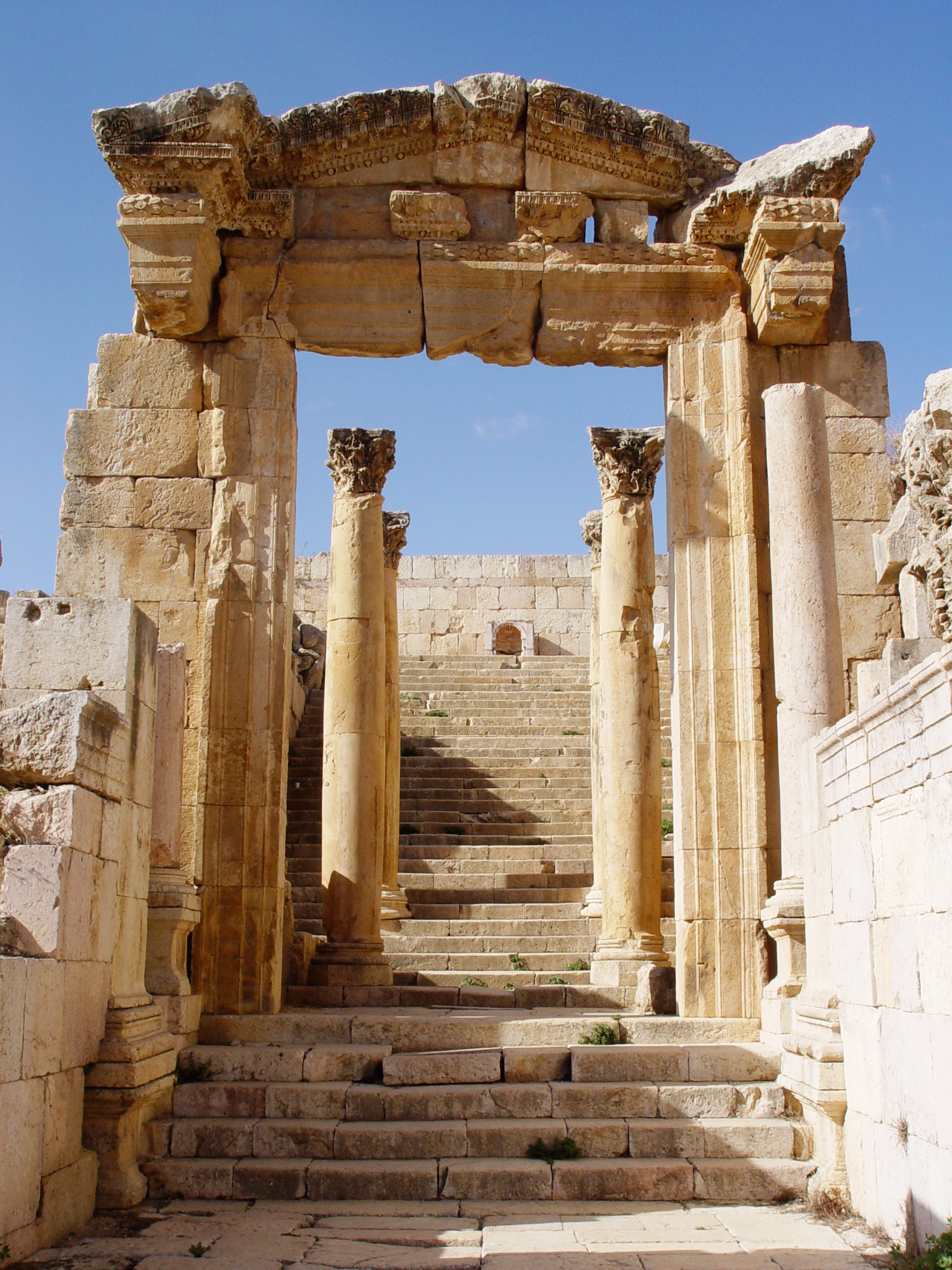
Inside Jerash

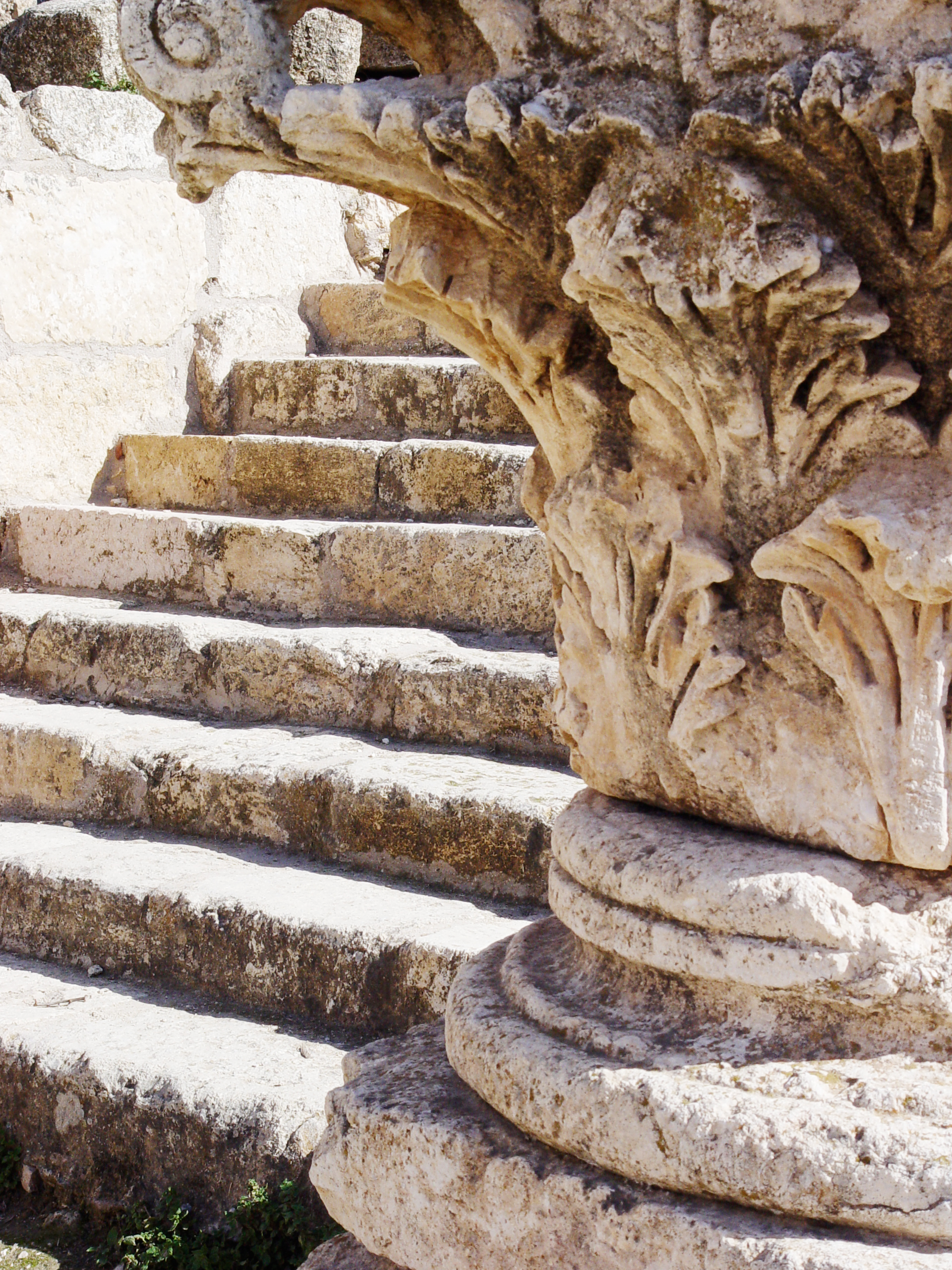
Jerash ornamentation

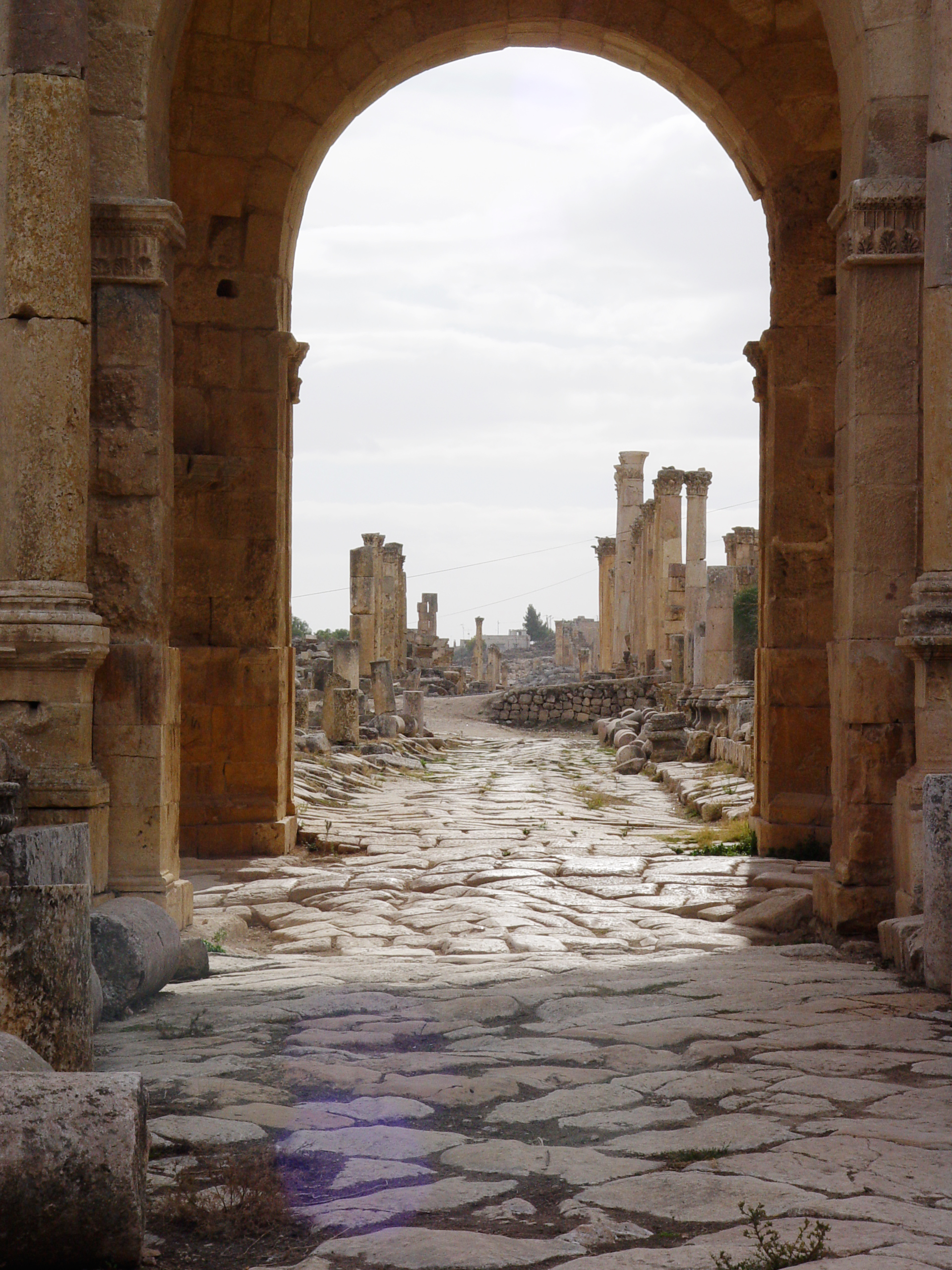
Inside Jerash

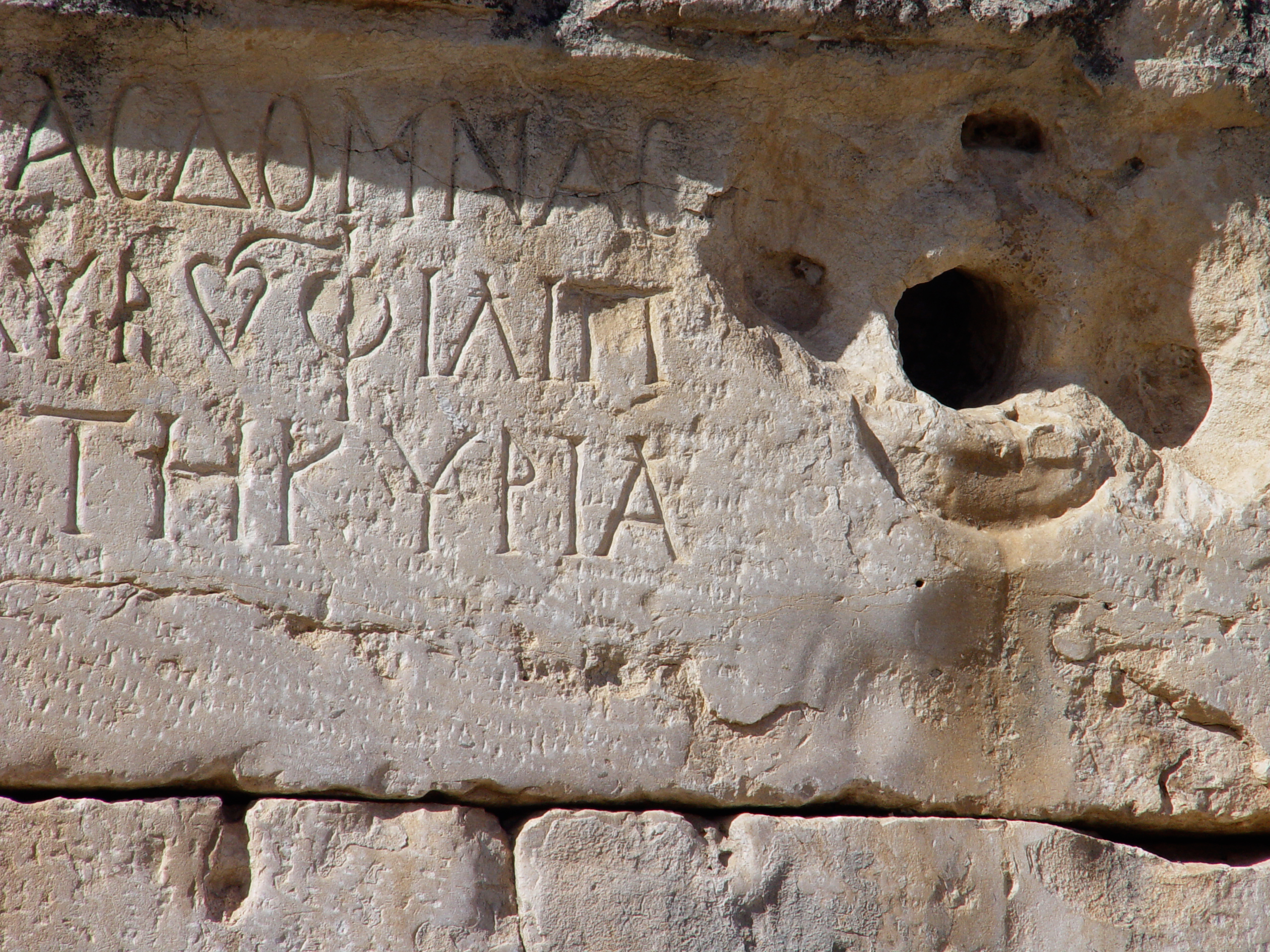
Inscriptions at Jerash

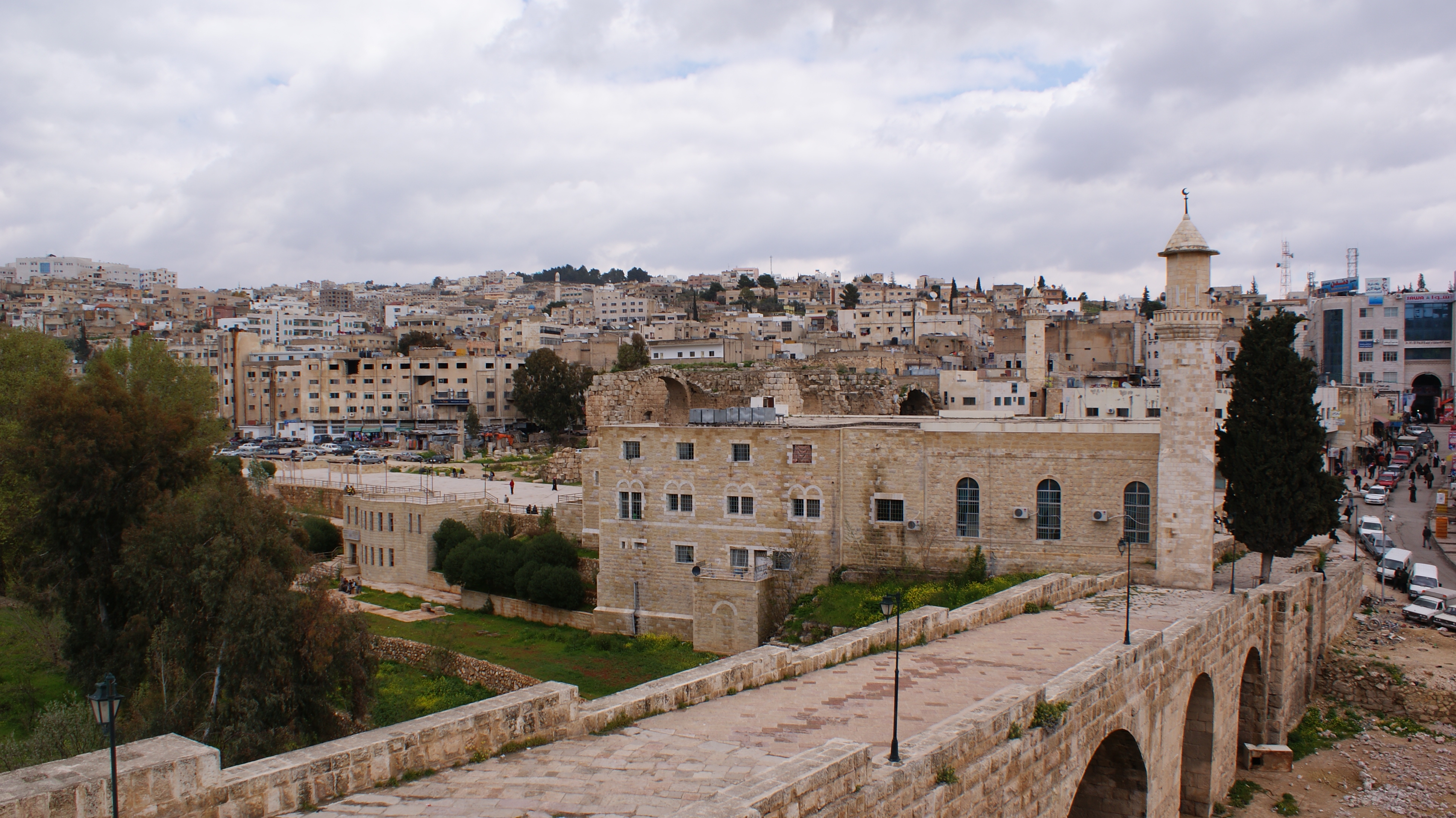
Old stone bridge linking modern and ancient Jerash

== See also ==
- Exorcism of the Gerasene demoniac
- Jerash Cathedral
- Scythopolis (Beth-Shean)
- Temple of Artemis, Jerash

== Bibliography ==
- Brown, J., E. Meyers, R. Talbert, T. Elliott, S. Gillies (25 October 2020). "Places: 678158 (Gerasa/Antiochia ad Chrysorhoam)". Pleiades.
- Government of Jordan, Department of Statistics (1964). First Census of Population and Housing. Volume I: Final Tables; General Characteristics of the Population (PDF).
- Hütteroth, W.-D.; Abdulfattah, K. (1977). Historical Geography of Palestine, Transjordan and Southern Syria in the Late 16th Century. Erlanger Geographische Arbeiten, Sonderband 5. Erlangen, Germany: Vorstand der Fränkischen Geographischen Gesellschaft. ISBN 3-920405-41-2.
- Kubiak-Schneider, Aleksandra; Lichtenberger, Achim (2022). "The God Pakeidas in Jerash – His Worship through Archaeological and Epgraphical Sources". Electrum. 29: 219–236. doi:10.4467/20800909EL.22.014.15784.
- Le Strange, G. (1890). Palestine Under the Moslems: A Description of Syria and the Holy Land from A.D. 650 to 1500. Committee of the Palestine Exploration Fund. (p. 462)
- Macalister, R. A. Stewart (1911). "Gerasa" . Encyclopædia Britannica. Vol. 11 (11th ed.). pp. 765–766.
- Robinson, E.; Smith, E. (1841). Biblical Researches in Palestine, Mount Sinai and Arabia Petraea: A Journal of Travels in the year 1838. Vol. 3. Boston: Crocker & Brewster.
