= Jerash Cathedral =

Ruins in Jerash, Jordan

Coordinates: 32.28056°N 35.89164°E

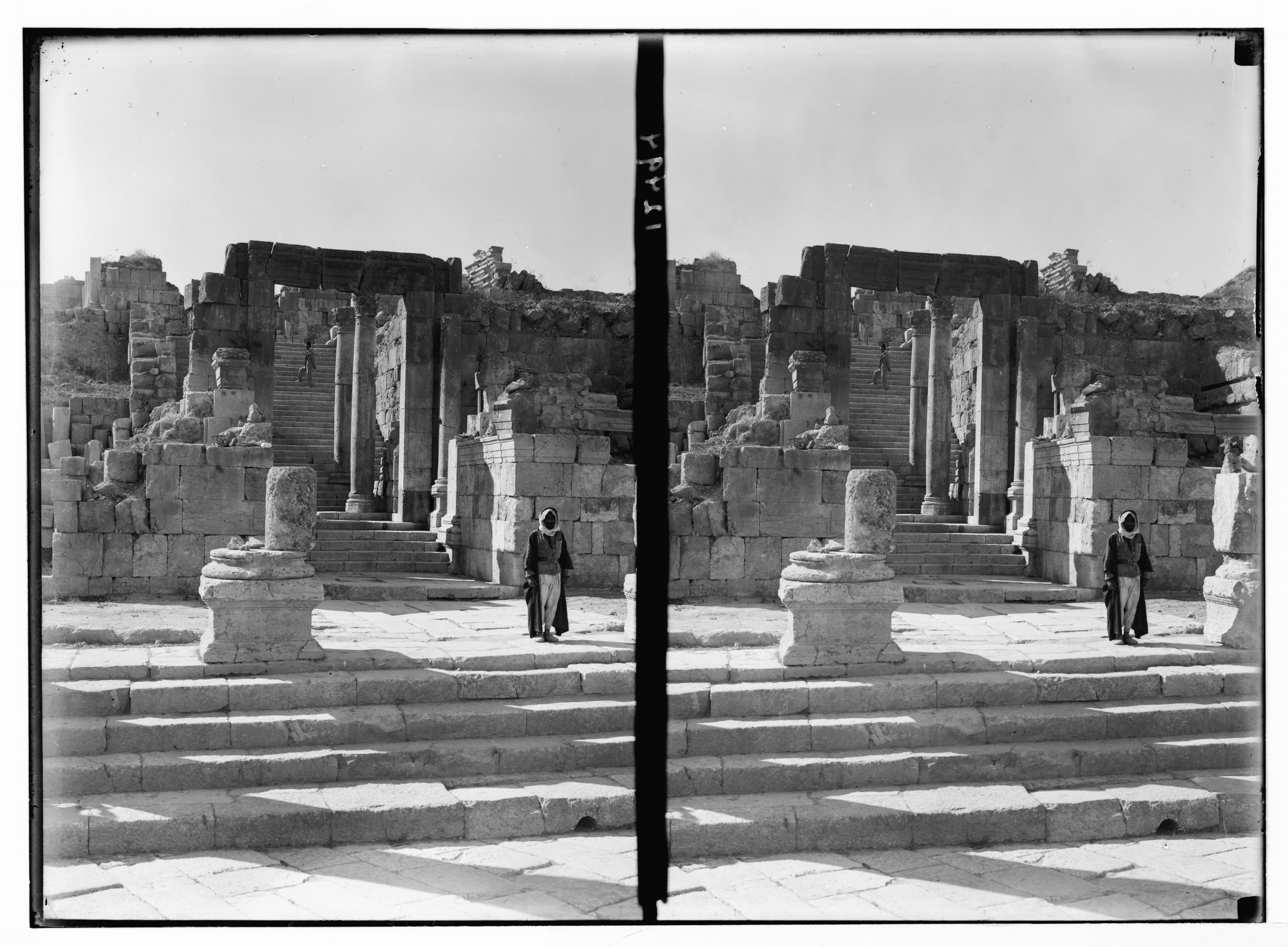
Jerash. Entrance to cathedral compound LOC matpc.04521.tif

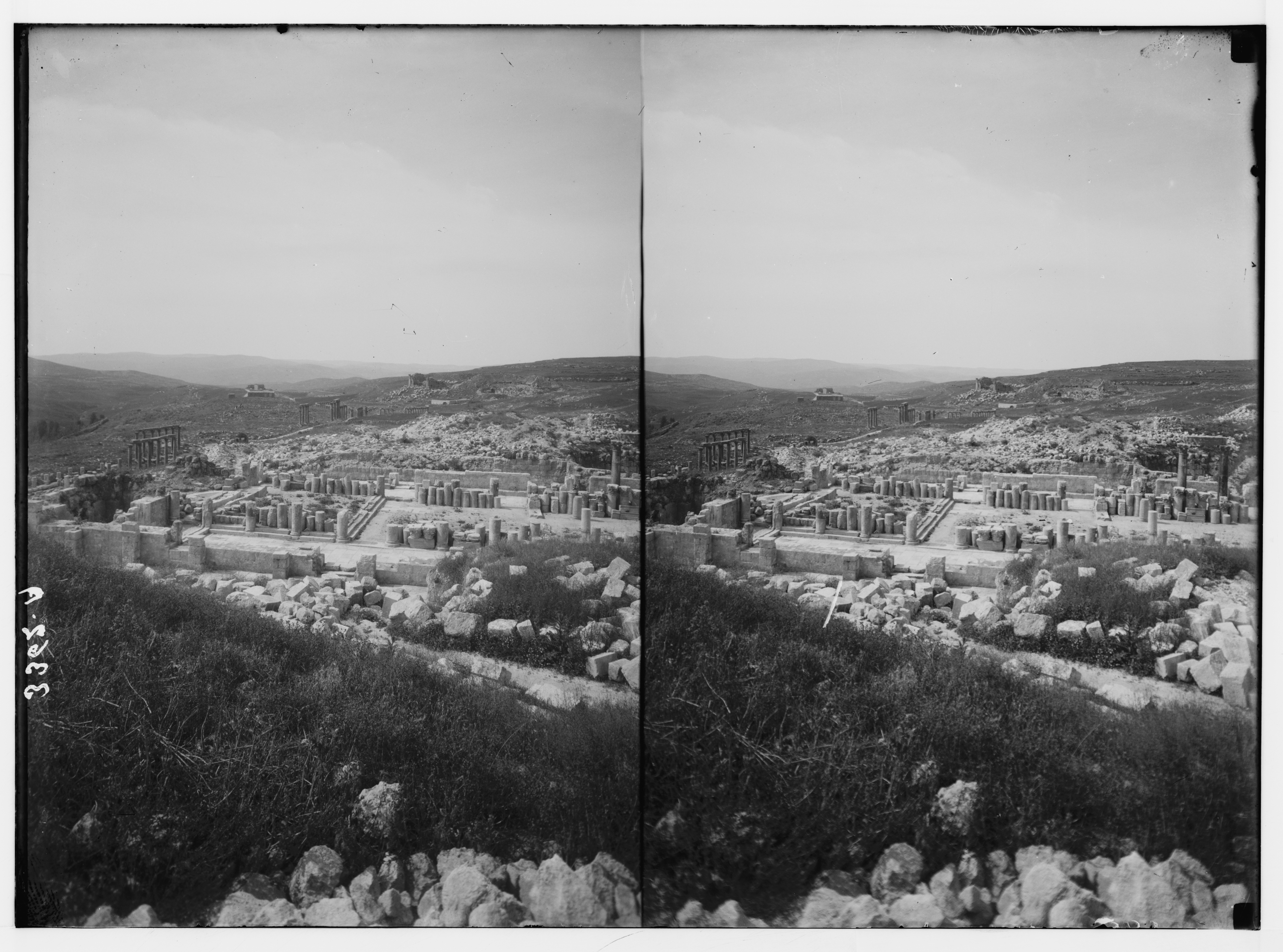
Ruins of Jerash (Gerasa). The cathedral ruins (Cathedral of St. Mary). Showing main avenue and the forum. LOC matpc.02752.tif

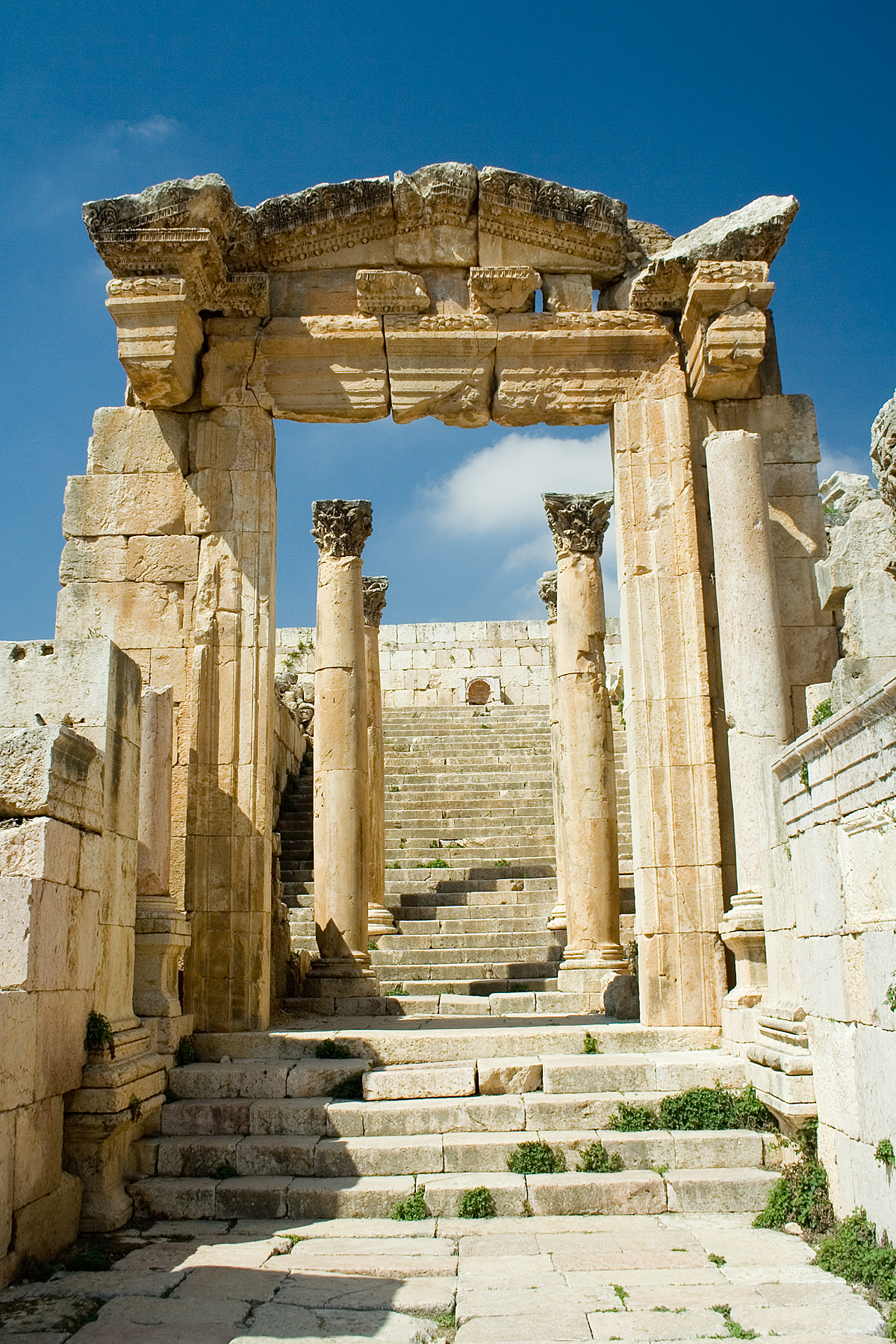
Jerash Cathedral Gateway - Attribution to David Bjorgen

Jerash Cathedral (Cathedral of St. Mary) in Jerash, Jordan, now in ruins, was built on the site of a former Roman temple.

== Construction ==
Jerash Cathedral was raised in the 4th century on the ruin of the Roman temple to Dionysus, which itself was built on the site of a temple to Dushara, the Nabataean god of the royal house. The remains of the Roman temple were removed to the level of the podium shortly before the start of construction of the new building of the cathedral, and its architectural elements, such as columns, were reused as material for the masonry of the church.

Named Cathedral of St. Mary, the ruins are shown in the black and white images which show the entrance to the cathedral compound and the main avenue and the forum.

== Other churches in Jerash ==
While Jerash (or Gerasa) is best known for its extensive number of churches, many are of impressive size. Most date from the 5th and 6th centuries and are basilican in plan.
