= Temple of Artemis, Jerash =

Roman temple in Jerash, Jordan

Coordinates: 32.2819°N 35.8909°E

The Jerash Temple of Artemis of Jordan

The Temple of Artemis at Gerasa is a Roman peripteral temple in Jerash, Jordan. The temple was built in the middle of the highest of the two terraces of the sanctuary, in the core of the ancient city. The temple is one of the most remarkable monuments left in the ancient city of Gerasa (Jerash) and throughout the Roman East.

== History ==
Artemis was the patron goddess of the city and was the Hellenistic interpretation of a local deity likely worshipped before the arrival of the Greek colonists, who instead imported in the city the cult of Zeus Olympios. We have evidence of an older sanctuary of Artemis from a few inscriptions. The construction of a new wider sanctuary was started after the Bar Kokhba revolt (AD 136). The propylaeum was completed in AD 150 during the reign of emperor Antoninus Pius, while the temple was never finished.

The portico around the cella was designed with six by eleven columns, of which only eleven columns in the pronaos are still standing, 13.20 m high. The Corinthian capitals are very well preserved and bear the signature of Hygeinos, the contractor in charge of carving the bases, shafts, and capitals of the columns. The portico and the cella stand on a podium built by a system of parallel vaults surrounded by a corridor, both accessible by two separate staircases from the cella. Two more staircases lead to the roof of the temple, a flat terrace probably used by the worshippers for rituals.

The interior of the cella was clad with polychrome marbles, as proven by the clamps' holes in the walls and fragments of verde antico slabs from the floor. At its back is the thalamos, an arched niche hosting the statue of the goddess.

In front of the steps of the temple, 18 m away, the moulded base of the altar has been identified under the structures left by the Byzantine and Early Islamic occupation of the terrace. The altar has a square plan, 12 m on a side and, it was built north of the central axis of the temple. From scarce spolia reused in later buildings, it was reconstructed as a tower-like structure with a plain base and half columns in the upper half.

At the end of the 4th century, the pagan cults were forbidden by the emperors' edicts. The temple of Artemis was entirely spoliated of the marble cladding of the cella, and the cornice of the gate was dismantled and replaced by plain jambs. The cella was paved with a polychrome mosaic floor and converted into a public reception hall. In the 6th century, the roof of the cella collapsed, and the whole building was further transformed into a private residential stronghold in the middle of a wide artisanal quarter that occupied the upper terrace of the sanctuary. The structures of the temple withstood the earthquake in AD 749.

Since the early 9th century, the residence was progressively abandoned, and the cella silted up with sandy deposits and garbage dumps. An earthquake between the 12th and 13th centuries demolished the upper half of the walls of the temple, and the rubble filled the entire area, inside and around the cella. The vaults of the podium remained accessible from outside and continued to be frequented until modern times by shepherds, squatters, and treasure hunters. There is no evidence that the Temple of Artemis could have been the fort occupied by the Arab garrison mentioned by William of Tyre in AD 1122.

W. J. Bankes and C. Barry first investigated the vaults of the podium between 1816 and 1819. The pronaos of the temple and parts of the portico were cleared by Clarence Stanley Fisher and the Anglo-American expedition between 1928 and 1934. The Italian Archaeological Mission has worked in the sanctuary of Artemis since 1978. In 2018, a cooperative project of conservation was started in the Temple of Artemis by the Jordanian Department of Antiquities and the Italian Archaeological Mission with a grant from the US Ambassadors Fund for Cultural Preservation.

== See also ==
- List of Ancient Roman temples
- List of Ancient Greek temples
