= Jerash Archaeological Museum =

- Established: 1928; 98 years ago
- Location: Jerash, Jordan
- Coordinates: 32.277920°N 35.891633°E
- Type: Archaeological Museum

The Jerash Archaeological Museum (Arabic: متحف آثار جرش) is a museum located in Jerash, Jordan. The museum is committed to preserving various historical artifacts from the Jerash Governorate. It is one of the oldest museums in Jordan.

== History ==
In 1928, the museum was established. In 1985, the museum was relocated to a rest house. In 2018, the museum received several statues from the excavations of the Eastern Roman Baths.

== Collections ==
The museum contains a collection of artifacts that have been excavated from different sites in the city of Jerash. The museum contains artifacts from different periods of Jordan's history, including objects from the Neolithic period, the Mamluk period and the Islamic period. The museum contains a collection of ancient pottery, statues, coins and jewelry. Archeological inscriptions can also be found in the museum garden. The museum also has a collection of mosaics. Among the objects in the museum's possession is an ancient coffin, one of the most important in the Middle East. The museum contains information about the origins and development of the city of Jerash.
