= Arch of Hadrian (Jerash) =

Triumphal arch in Jerash, Jordan

Coordinates: 32°16′20″N 35°53′28″E

Arch of Hadrian.

The Arch of Hadrian is an ancient Roman structure in Jerash, Jordan. It is an 11-metre-high, triple-arched gateway erected to honor the visit of Roman Emperor Hadrian to the city (then called Gerasa) in the winter of 129–130. The arch originally stood at almost 22 m and probably had wooden doors. It features some unconventional, possibly Nabataean, architectural features, such as acanthus bases. The monument served both as a commemorative arch and as an approach to Gerasa. The Arch's relative remoteness from the city walls points to a plan for southward expansion of Gerasa during its heyday. The expansion, however, was not implemented.

== Description ==
In 2005, the arch was under restoration. Reconstruction was completed in 2007 and the arch is now roughly 21 meters high (about 36 feet), 37.45 meters long, and 9.25 meters wide.

Each face of the arch has four engaged columns standing on pedestals and bases. Each pedestal is 2.20 meters high, 2.25 meters wide and 1.20 meters deep. The base of each column is topped by a row of acanthus leaves.

There are three vaulted passageways on the lower level and each of these is flanked by two columns with Corinthian capitals. The two flanked archways are topped with niches. Each niche is on top of a small entablature, which stands on two pilasters crowned with capitals.

The Arch was crowned with an attic, which might have held a dedicatory inscription. The lower part of the attic was decorated with a frieze of acanthus leaves and the central part was crowned with a triangular cornice.

== Inscription ==
There was a marble tabula ansata panel that was 1.03 meters in height and 7.14 meters in width, with letters 12–13 cm tall.

== See also ==
- List of Roman triumphal arches
- Arch of Hadrian (Athens)
