= Jerash Festival =

Jordanian cultural festival

Jerash Festival of Culture and Arts
- Genre: Culture and arts
- Dates: Late July to early August
- Locations: Jerash, Jordan
- Years active: 1981–present
- Attendance: 150,000
- Patron: Jerash Roman theaters
- Website: jerashfestival.jo/ar (in Arabic)

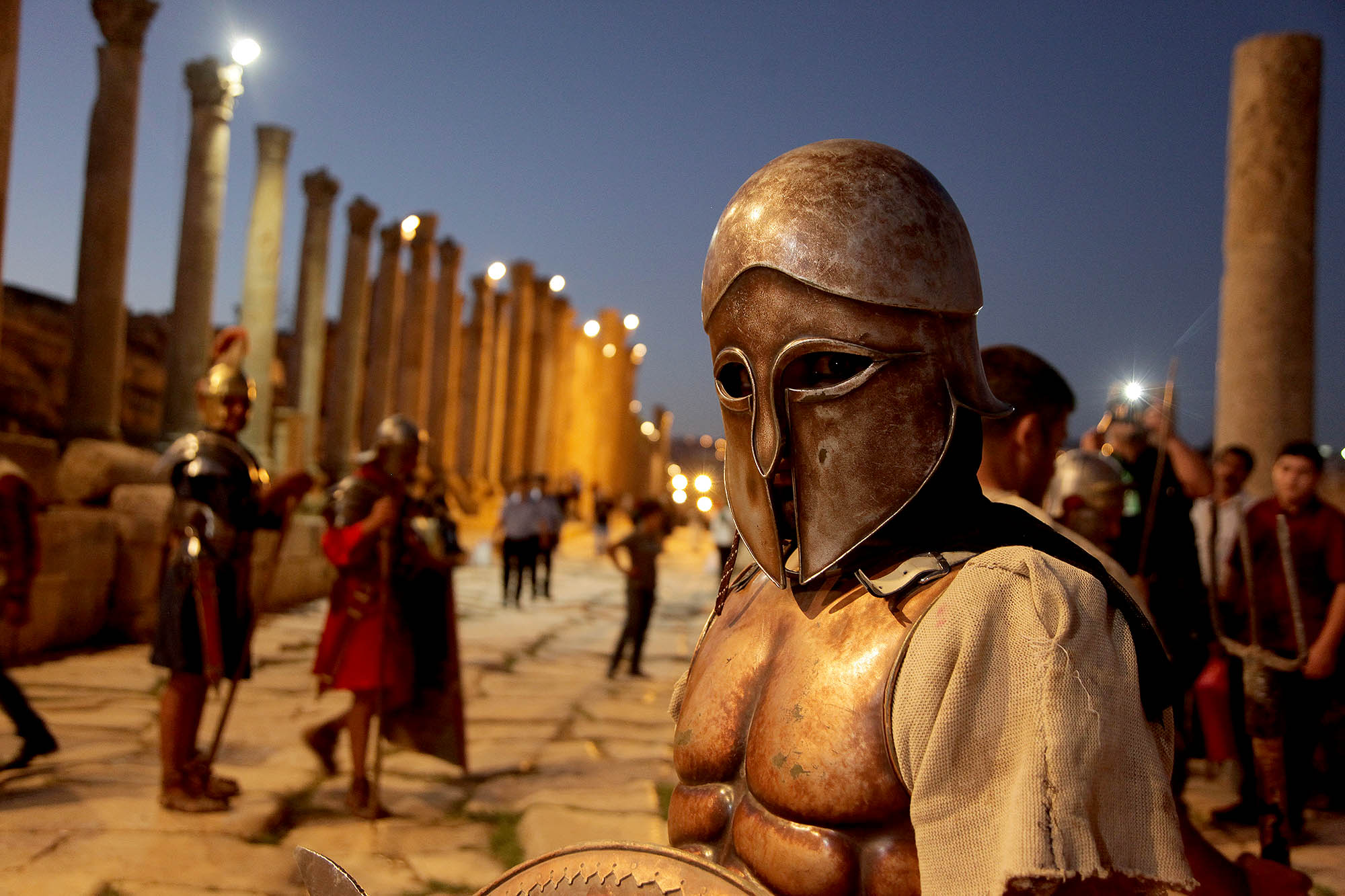
Jerash Festival 2018

The Jerash Festival for Culture and Arts is an annual event held in Jerash, Jordan. It is part of the Jordan Festival, which aims to enrich cultural activities in Jordan. Founded in 1981 by Queen Noor, it features several shows performed by Jordanian, Arab and foreign artists.

== Festival ==
In 2015, the festival hosted 40 different Jordanian artists in Jerash, along with popular Arab singers such as Najwa Karam, Maya Diab and Wael Kfoury. The festival is one of the largest cultural activities in the region with millions of attendees. The 31st Jerash Festival in 2016 attracted over 100,000 visitors and the attendance rates were greater than the previous year.
