= Index of robotics articles =

Robotics is the branch of technology that deals with the design, construction, operation, structural disposition, manufacture and application of robots. Robotics is related to the sciences of electronics, engineering, mechanics, and software. The word "robot" was introduced to the public by Czech writer Karel Čapek in his play R.U.R. (Rossum's Universal Robots), published in 1920. The term "robotics" was coined by Isaac Asimov in his 1941 science fiction short-story "Liar!"

Articles related to robotics include:

== 0–9 ==
- *batteries not included
- 20Q
- 321 kinematic structure
- 3D pose estimation
- 5DX
- 790 (robot)
- 8 Man
- 964 Pinocchio

== A ==
- A.P.E.X.
- Aaron Doral
- ABB Group
- ABC Warriors
- ABU Robocon
- Acoustical engineering
- ACROSS Project
- Action description language
- Action selection
- Actuator
- Adam (robot)
- Adam Link
- Adaptable robotics
- Adaptive control
- Adelbrecht
- Adept Technology
- Admissible heuristic
- Adventures of Sonic the Hedgehog
- Aerobot
- Aerospace
- Affective computing
- Agent Systems Reference Model
- AgentSheets
- Agricultural robot
- AI-complete
- AI box
- AI winter
- AIBO
- Albert Hubo
- Albert One
- Alberto Broggi
- Alex Raymond
- Algorithmic probability
- Ali Jadbabaie
- Alice mobile robot
- Alien 3
- Alien Resurrection
- Alienator
- Aliens
- Allen (robot)
- Almost Human: Making Robots Think
- Alpha 5
- Amazo
- American robotics
- Analog robot
- And–or tree
- André Guignard
- Andrew Martin (The Bicentennial Man)
- Andrew Ng
- Android
- Android (robot)
- Android science
- ANDROS (robot)
- Andy the Messenger Robot (Many Other Functions)
- Angel F
- Animatronics
- Ant robotics
- Anthony Daniels
- Anthrobotics
- Anticipation (artificial intelligence)
- Any-angle path planning
- Anybots
- Anytime algorithm
- Aphrodite IX
- Applications of artificial intelligence
- Applied science
- Archie Humanoid Robot
- Arduino
- Arizona State University
- Arm solution
- Armored Combat Engineer Robot
- Armoured Gideon
- Arthur C. Clarke
- Arthur Saint-Leon
- Articulated robot
- Artificial Ants
- Artificial brain
- Artificial consciousness
- Artificial Imagination
- Artificial intelligence
- Artificial intelligence and law
- Artificial intelligence marketing
- Artificial Intelligence System
- Artificial intelligence systems integration
- Artificial intelligence, situated approach
- Artificial Life
- Artificial neural network
- Artificial psychology
- Arts
- ASEA IRB
- Ash (Alien)
- Ashutosh Tewari
- ASIMO
- ASR-complete
- Association for the Advancement of Artificial Intelligence
- Astro Boy
- Astro Boy (character)
- Astro Boy
- Astrochicken
- Asuran
- ATHLETE (robot)
- ATLANTIS architecture
- Atomic Robo
- Attributional calculus
- Audiotrope
- Auguste Villiers de l'Isle-Adam
- Aura (satellite)
- Autognostics
- Automated guided vehicle
- Automated Mathematician
- Automated planning and scheduling
- Automated reasoning
- Automated restaurant
- Automatic painting (robotic)
- Automatic waste container
- Automatika
- Automation
- Automatix
- Automaton
- Automotive engineering
- Auton
- Autonomic Computing
- Autonomic Networking
- Autonomous agent
- Autonomous logistics
- Autonomous research robot
- Autonomous robot
- Autonomous Underwater Vehicle
- Autonomous vehicle
- Autonomous weapon
- Ayanna Howard

== B ==
- B&R
- B.A.T. (G.I. Joe)
- Backward chaining
- Ballbot
- Bang-bang robot
- Barrett Technology
- Base Wars
- Baseball robot
- Bashir Syed
- Bastion (comics)
- Battle droid
- Bayesian network
- BEAM robotics
- Beautie
- Bees algorithm
- Behavior-based robotics
- Behavioral science
- Belief-Desire-Intention model
- Ben Burtt
- Bender (Futurama)
- Berkeley Lower Extremity Exoskeleton
- Bernhard Nebel
- Bernoulli grip
- Bicentennial Man
- Big Trak
- BigDog
- Bill & Ted's Bogus Journey
- Bill Corbett
- Bio-inspired computing
- BioHazard
- Biology
- Biomechanics
- Biomimetic
- Bionics
- Biorobotics
- Biped
- Bishop (Alien)
- Black Knight (vehicle)
- Blackboard system
- Blaise Bontems
- Blendo
- Blobotics
- Bob May (actor)
- Boe-Bot
- Boilerplate (robot)
- Bolo (tank)
- Boston Dynamics
- Bottom-up design
- Boustrophedon cell decomposition
- Bow Leg
- Bowler Communications System
- Brains (Transformers)
- Branimir Makanec
- Brave Raideen
- Brent Spiner
- Brigitte Helm
- Brynocki
- Building automation
- BURN-E
- Bush robot

== C ==
- C-3PO
- CALO
- Cambot
- Cameron (Terminator)
- Campus Party
- Canadarm2
- Care-Providing Robot FRIEND
- Carmen Toolkit
- Carter Bays
- Cartesian coordinate robot
- Cartesian coordinates
- Caterpillar track
- Cerebellar Model Articulation Controller
- CETpD
- Chandra X-ray Observatory
- Chatterbox Challenge
- Chebychev–Grübler–Kutzbach criterion
- Chemical engineering
- Chess as mental training
- Chi (Chobits)
- Chibi-Robo!
- Chico MacMurtrie
- Chinese room
- Chōdenji Machine Voltes V
- Chōdenji Robo Combattler V
- Chopping Mall
- Choujinki Metalder
- Christopher G. Atkeson
- Clanking replicator
- Class of 1999 II: The Substitute
- Claudia Mitchell
- Claytronics
- Cleanroom
- Climber (BEAM)
- Cloud robotics
- CMUcam
- Cobie Smulders
- Cobot
- Cobweb (clustering)
- Coco (robot)
- Cog (project)
- Cognitive Info-Communications (CogInfoCom)
- Cognitive robotics
- Cognitive science
- Cognitive tutor
- Colin Angle
- Collective intelligence
- Combs method
- Common normal (robotics)
- Commonsense reasoning
- Comparison of domestic robots
- Competitions and prizes in artificial intelligence
- Computational creativity
- Computational humor
- Computational intelligence
- Computational Intelligence (journal)
- Computational linguistics
- Computational neuroscience
- Computationally enhanced craft item
- Computer-aided design
- Computer-aided manufacturing
- Computer-assisted proof
- Computer-assisted surgery
- Computer Audition
- Computer cluster
- Computer Engineering
- Computer game bot Turing Test
- Computer science
- Computer software
- Computer vision
- Conceptual dependency theory
- Concurrent MetateM
- Connectionist expert system
- Constrained Conditional Models
- Constructionist design methodology
- Contract Net Protocol
- Control engineering
- Control systems
- Coppélia
- Corinna E. Lathan
- CoroWare
- Coupe de France de robotique
- Covariance intersection
- Crash and Burn
- Crawler (BEAM)
- Crow T. Robot
- CRS Robotics
- Cruise missile
- Crusher (robot)
- Cubix
- Cyberdyne Inc. (Japanese company)
- Cyberflora
- Cybernetics
- Cyborg
- Cyborg Anthropology
- Cyborg She
- Cyborgs in fiction
- Cylon (Battlestar Galactica)
- Cylon (reimagining)
- Cynthia Breazeal

== D ==
- D*
- D.A.V.E.
- Daleks – Invasion Earth: 2150 A.D.
- Dan Danknick
- Daniel Paluska
- Daniela L. Rus
- Dario Floreano
- Data (Star Trek)
- Data pack
- David B. Samadi
- David Hanson (robotics designer)
- David Ross (actor)
- Deadblow
- Deadeye (Starriors)
- Deadly Friend
- Death Machine
- Decision list
- Degrees of freedom (mechanics)
- Delphine Courtney
- Delta robot
- Denavit–Hartenberg parameters
- Developmental robotics
- Devil Girl from Mars
- Dexter Industries
- Dextre
- Diagnosis (artificial intelligence)
- Dick Tufeld
- Dieter Fox
- Differential wheeled robot
- Digesting Duck
- Digital control
- Digital image processing
- Dimensionality reduction
- Disability robot
- Distributed architecture for mobile navigation (DAMN)
- DOK-ING
- Don Cuco El Guapo
- Dors Venabili
- Dr. Goldfoot and the Girl Bombs
- Dr. Who and the Daleks
- Dragon Runner
- Driverless car
- Droid (Star Wars)
- Dynamic Man (Timely Comics)
- Dynamic time warping
- Dynamic window approach
- Dynamics (physics)

== E ==
- E-puck mobile robot
- E. T. A. Hoffmann
- Eager (novel)
- Eando Binder
- Ecovacs Robotics
- Edmund H. North
- Edward S. Ellis
- EKF SLAM
- Electrical engineering
- Electroadhesion
- Electronic engineering
- Electronic Stability Control
- Electronics
- Elektro
- Elephant's trunk
- Ellen Tigh
- Embodied agent
- Embodied cognition
- Embodied cognitive science
- Emergent behavior
- EMIEW
- EMIEW 2
- Encrypt
- Energetically Autonomous Tactical Robot
- Energid Technologies
- Engineering
- Engineering cybernetics
- Enon (robot)
- Ensemble averaging
- Ensemble axiom
- Entomopter
- Envelope (motion)
- Epigenetic robotics
- Epistemic modal logic
- Epson Robots
- Erek King
- Eric Paulos
- Ernest Lenard Hall
- Ernesto Morgado
- Ernst Dickmanns
- eSTAR
- Ethics
- Ethics of artificial intelligence
- European Robotic Arm
- EusLisp Robot Programming Language
- EveR-1
- Evolution Robotics
- Evolutionary algorithms
- Evolutionary computation
- Evolutionary developmental robotics
- Evolutionary robotics
- Evolver
- Evolving classification function
- Evolving intelligent system
- Expert system
- Exploration problem
- Extended Kalman filter
- Extremal optimization

== F ==
- Fairground ride
- Family Inada
- FANUC
- FANUC Robotics America Corporation
- Farewell to the Master
- Federation of International Robot-soccer Association
- Feedback control
- Feelix Growing
- FemiSapien
- Festo
- Fiction
- Film
- FIRST
- Flame (robot)
- Flash Gordon
- Flier (BEAM)
- Flight of the Navigator
- Flight simulator
- Foot Clan
- Forbidden Planet
- Forward chaining
- Forward kinematic animation
- Forward kinematics
- Foster-Miller
- Foton-M
- Frame problem
- Francesco Mondada
- Frank Dellaert
- Frankenstein complex
- Frankie Darro
- Fred Chatterbot
- Fred M. Wilcox (director)
- Freddy II
- Friendly Robotics
- Fritz Lang
- Funnybot
- FurReal Friends
- Futurama
- Fuzzy agent
- Fuzzy logic

== G ==
- Gabbay's separation theorem
- Gakutensoku
- Galaxina
- Galen Tyrol
- Game theory
- Gardner Fox
- Garry Chalk
- Gastrobot
- Gay Robot
- Gene Roddenberry
- George (robot)
- George A. Bekey
- George Devol
- George Lucas
- Gerd Hirzinger
- Getter Robo
- Giant Robot Project
- Gil Weinberg
- Gizmo (comic book)
- Gladiator tactical unmanned ground vehicle
- Glossary of robotics
- Go Nagai
- Gobots
- Gödel machine
- Godzilla Against Mechagodzilla
- Godzilla vs. King Ghidorah
- Godzilla vs. Mechagodzilla
- Godzilla vs. Mechagodzilla II
- Godzilla vs. Megalon
- Godzilla vs. SpaceGodzilla
- Godzilla: Tokyo S.O.S.
- GOFAI
- Goofy
- Google driverless car
- Gort (The Day the Earth Stood Still)
- Grammar systems theory
- GraphSLAM
- Grendizer
- Grendizer (mecha)
- Grounder
- Guardium
- Guardromon
- Guidance, navigation, and control
- Guided rat
- Gumstix
- GuRoo
- Gynoid
- Gypsy (Mystery Science Theater 3000)

== H ==
- HAL 5
- HAL 9000
- Haile (robot)
- Halfmann Teleskoptechnik
- Halloween III: Season of the Witch
- Hammerstein (comics)
- Handy Board
- Hans Moravec
- Haptic technology
- Hardiman
- Hardware
- Haro (character)
- Harry Bates (author)
- Hartmut Neven
- Hartmut Surmann
- Harvest Automation
- Heartbeeps
- Helen Greiner
- Hendrik Van Brussel
- Henrik I. Christensen
- HERO (robot)
- Hexapod (robotics)
- Hexapoda
- Hexbug
- Hidden Markov random field
- Hierarchical control system
- Hinokio
- Hiroshi Ishiguro
- History of artificial intelligence
- History of robots
- History of technology
- HK-47
- HOAP
- Hod Lipson
- Hollywood
- Holonomic
- Homayoun Seraji
- Home automation
- Honda E series
- Honda P series
- How I Met Your Mother
- How to Make a Monster
- Howie Choset
- HRP-4C
- HUBO
- Hugh F. Durrant-Whyte
- Human-robot interaction
- Human–computer interaction
- Human leg
- Humanoid
- Humanoid robot
- Humanoid Robotics Project
- Hybrid Assistive Limb
- Hybrid intelligent system
- Hybrid neural network
- Hybrot
- Hydraulics

== I ==
- I, Robot
- I, Robot
- I, Robot (short story)
- ICAD (software)
- Ichigeki Sacchu!! HoiHoi-san
- IJCAI Computers and Thought Award
- Incremental heuristic search
- Industrial robot
- The Industries of the Future (book)
- Informatics (academic field)
- Information extraction
- Insbot
- Inspector Gadget
- Inspector Gadget 2
- Institute for Personal Robots in Education
- Institute of Automation
- Institute of Electrical and Electronics Engineers
- Institute of Robotics and Intelligent Systems
- Institution of Engineering and Technology
- Intelligence
- Intelligent Actuator
- Intelligent agent
- Intelligent control
- Intelligent Database
- Intelligent decision support systems
- Intelligent Small World Autonomous Robots for Micro-manipulation
- Intelligent vehicle technologies
- Intelligent word recognition
- International Conference On Intelligent Robots and Systems
- International Robot Exhibition
- Intuitive Surgical
- Inverse dynamics
- Inverse kinematics
- IRobot Dirt Dog
- IRobot Seaglider
- Irwin Allen
- Isaac Asimov
- IsaacRobot
- ITALK Project

== J ==
- J. Storrs Hall
- Jacques de Vaucanson
- James S. Albus
- Janice Em
- Janice Kawaye
- Japan Robot Association
- Japanese robotics
- Jaquet-Droz automata
- Jaydev P. Desai
- Jean-Claude Latombe
- Jed the Humanoid
- Jedikiah (Tomorrow People)
- Jeff Lieberman (roboticist)
- Jenny Wakeman
- Jesse Sullivan
- Jet Jaguar
- Jetter Mars
- Jim Mallon
- JO-ZERO
- Joanne Pransky
- João Pavão Martins
- Joel Hodgson
- Johann Borenstein
- John Cavil
- John DiMaggio
- John J. Leonard
- John Lenahan
- Johns Hopkins Beast
- Joint Compatibility Branch and Bound
- Joint constraints
- Jorge Cham
- Joseph Engelberger
- Josh Weinstein
- Jumper (BEAM)
- Justin (robot)
- Juvenile

== K ==
- K-9 (Doctor Who)
- Kalman filter
- Karel Čapek
- KARR (Knight Rider)
- Katia Sycara
- Kelex
- Ken Goldberg
- Ken Ishikawa
- Kenny Baker
- Kevin Warwick
- KHR-1
- Kidnapped robot problem
- Kikaider
- Kikaider (character)
- Kim Jong-Hwan
- Kinect
- Kinematic chain
- Kinematics
- Kinemation
- King Joe (Ultra monster)
- King Kong Escapes
- Kinodynamic planning
- Kismet (robot)
- KITT
- Kiva Systems
- Klann linkage
- Knights
- Knowledge-based Configuration
- Knowledge-based systems
- Knowledge compilation
- Knowledge level
- Knowledge representation
- KO PROPO
- Koolvac
- Kronos
- Kryten
- KUKA

== L ==
- L. Frank Baum
- LAGR
- Laboratory automation
- Laboratory robotics
- Lamina emergent mechanisms (LEMs)
- Land Walker
- Language/action perspective
- Latent variable
- Leg
- Legged robot
- Legged Squad Support System
- Léo Delibes
- Leoben Conoy
- Leonardo's robot
- Leonardo (robot)
- LESH
- Leslie P. Kaelbling
- Liar!
- LIDA (cognitive architecture)
- Linear
- Linear actuator
- Liquid handling robot
- List of artificial intelligence projects
- List of Doctor Who robots
- List of emerging technologies
- List of fictional gynoids
- List of fictional robots and androids
- List of life forms
- List of My Life as a Teenage Robot characters
- List of programming languages for artificial intelligence
- List of Robots characters
- List of To Heart series characters
- Literature
- Little Orbit the Astrodog and the Screechers from Outer Space
- Little Robots
- Lock Martin
- Locomotion
- Loebner Prize
- Logic programming
- Looj
- LOPES (exoskeleton)
- LORAX (robot)
- Lost in Space
- Lost in Space
- Lothar (Metabarons)
- Lunokhod 1
- Lunokhod 2
- Lyappa arm

== M ==
- M. Anthony Lewis (roboticist)
- M.A.S.K.
- Machine Empire Baranoia
- Machine learning
- Machine listening
- Machine olfaction
- Machine perception
- Machine Robo Rescue
- Machine Robo: Battle Hackers
- Machine Robo: Revenge of Cronos
- Machine vision
- Magnus Egerstedt
- Mahoromatic
- MAHRU
- MakerBot Industries
- Manifold integration
- Manifold learning
- Manipulability ellipsoid
- Manipulator (device)
- Manix
- Manuela M. Veloso
- Marc Raibert
- MARCbot
- Marine technology
- Mark Leon
- Mark Overmars
- Mark Pauline
- Mark Stephen Meadows
- Mark Tilden
- Mark W. Spong
- Markov logic network
- Markov random field
- MarkV-A1
- Mars Pathfinder
- Mars Science Laboratory
- Marvin (robot)
- Marvin Miller (actor)
- Marvin the Paranoid Android
- Masahiro Mori
- Maschinenmensch
- Master of the World
- MATILDA (Military robot)
- Matt Groening
- Matt Nagle
- Matthew T. Mason
- Mazinger Z
- Mazinger Z (robot)
- Means-ends analysis
- Mechani-Kong
- Mechanical engineering
- Mechanics
- Mechanismo
- Mechanon
- Mechatronics
- Media Lab Europe's social robots
- Megasaurus
- Megatron (Transformers)
- Meinü robot
- Mendel Stromm
- Metal Mickey
- Metal Sonic
- Métamatic
- Metin Sitti
- MetraLabs GmbH
- Metropolis (anime)
- Metropolis
- Michael Chorost
- Michael Collins (computational linguist)
- Micro air vehicle
- Microbotics
- Microelectromechanical systems
- Microrobotics
- Microsoft Robotics Studio
- Mighty Orbots
- Mikamo and Yataka
- Mil Mascaras vs. the Aztec Mummy
- Military science
- Mindpixel
- MindRACES
- MineCam
- Minimally invasive surgery
- Minimum redundancy feature selection
- Miomir Vukobratović
- Mission Mars
- Mitsuteru Yokoyama
- Miyu Greer
- Mobile Land Mine
- Mobile manipulator
- Mobile robot
- Mobile robot navigation
- Mobile Robot Programming Toolkit
- Modal logic
- Model-based reasoning
- Model robot
- Modular Advanced Armed Robotic System
- Molecular nanotechnology
- Monte Carlo localization
- Monte Carlo POMDP
- Moravec's paradox
- Morphogenetic robotics
- Motion (physics)
- Motion controller
- Motion planning
- Motoman
- Motor (disambiguation)
- Motor control
- Movax
- MRI Robot
- Multi-Agent Programming Contest
- Multi-agent system
- Multiple discriminant analysis
- Musa (robot)
- Music and artificial intelligence
- My Life as a Teenage Robot
- Mystery Science Theater 3000
- Mystery Science Theater 3000: The Movie

== N ==
- Nabaztag
- Nano Quest
- Nanoengineering
- Nanomorph
- Nanorobotics
- Nao (robot)
- NASA
- NASA robots
- Natural City
- Natural-language processing
- Natural-language understanding
- Navigation function
- Navigation research
- Neato Robotics
- Necrons
- Neil Harbisson
- Nemesis
- Nemesis 2: Nebula
- Nemesis 3: Prey Harder
- Nemesis 4: Death Angel
- Neural modeling fields
- Neural network (machine learning)
- Neuro-fuzzy
- Neuron Robotics
- Neurorobotics
- Nomad 200
- Nomad rover
- NOMFET
- Non-silicon robot
- Norby
- Nouvelle AI
- Number Eight (Battlestar Galactica)
- Number Four (Battlestar Galactica)
- Number Seven (Battlestar Galactica)
- Number Six (Battlestar Galactica)
- Number Three (Battlestar Galactica)
- Nurse (Ultra monster)
- Nv network

== O ==
- Object Action Complex
- Obstacle avoidance
- Occupancy grid mapping
- Odometry
- Omega Doom
- Omnibot
- Ontology engineering
- Ontology learning
- Open-source hardware
- Open-source robotics
- Open Directory Project
- Open Mind Common Sense
- OpenAIR
- OpenCog
- OpenRAVE
- Operator (Ghost in the Shell)
- Opportunity rover
- Optical engineering
- Optimus Prime
- Orazio
- Ordered weighted averaging aggregation operator
- Osamu Tezuka
- Outline of artificial intelligence
- Outline of automation
- Outline of machines
- Outline of technology
- Ozma of Oz

== P ==
- PackBot
- Paint robot
- Panda-Z
- Parallel manipulator
- Parity benchmark
- Particle filter
- Passive dynamics
- Patient registration
- Patrick Brantseg
- Paul Verhoeven
- Pepper (robot)
- Percept (artificial intelligence)
- Perceptual Computing
- Perceptual Robotics
- Perrone Robotics
- Personal Robot
- Pete (Disney)
- Peter Nordin
- Pfaffian constraint
- Pharmacy automation
- Phidget
- Phil Tippett
- Philosophy
- Philosophy of artificial intelligence
- Phobot
- Phoenix-bot Phoenix King
- Photoreflector
- Physical computing
- Physicomimetics
- Physics
- PINO
- Pipeline video inspection
- Planeta Bur
- Planner (programming language)
- Plantoid
- Player Project
- Plen
- Pleo
- Plug & Pray
- Pluto (Astro Boy)
- Pneumatic artificial muscles
- Pneumatics
- Pocketdelta robot
- Polly (robot)
- Pose (computer vision)
- Powered exoskeleton
- Principle of rationality
- Probabilistic logic network
- Probabilistic roadmap
- PROGOL
- Programmable Universal Machine for Assembly
- Programming by Demonstration
- Progress in artificial intelligence
- Project Joshua Blue
- Project Shadowchaser
- Project Shadowchaser II
- Project Shadowchaser III
- Project Shadowchaser IV
- Prosthetic
- PROWLER
- Psychology
- Push the Talking Trash Can
- Puzzlehead
- Python Robotics

== Question ==
- QRIO

== R ==
- R. Daneel Olivaw
- R.O.B.
- R.U.R. (Rossum's Universal Robots)
- R2-D2
- Radiotrope
- Randall Beer
- RanXerox
- RAPID
- Rapid prototyping
- Rapidly exploring random tree
- RapidMiner
- RAPOSA
- Rational agent
- Ray Solomonoff
- Raymond Goertz
- RB5X
- Real Robot
- Real Steel
- Recurrent neural network
- Recursive self-improvement
- Red Dwarf
- Red Dwarf characters
- Red Whittaker
- REEM-B
- Reinforcement learning
- Reis Robotics
- Remote center compliance
- Remote handling
- Remote manipulator
- Remote surgery
- Replicant
- Replicator (Stargate)
- Rescue robot
- Rescue Robots
- Research and development
- Reverse-Flash
- Reymond Clavel
- Reza Olfati-Saber
- Richard Vaughan (robotics)
- RNA Automation
- Ro-Busters
- Rob Grant
- Robai
- Robbie (short story)
- Robby the Robot
- Robert C. Michelson
- Robert Heinlein
- Robert Kinoshita
- Robert Llewellyn
- Robert Wise
- Robert Wood (roboticist)
- Robin Sparkles
- Robita
- Roblog
- Robo Machine
- Robo Machines
- Robo Machines (comic)
- Robo One
- RoboCop
- RoboCop 2
- RoboCop 3
- Robocrane
- RoboCup 2D Soccer Simulation League
- RoboCup Middle Size League
- Roboexotica
- RoboGeisha
- RoboLogix
- Robomagellan
- Robonaut
- Robonexus
- Robopsychology
- RoboRocks
- RoboSapien
- Robosapien v2
- Robot
- Robot-assisted heart surgery
- Robot-sumo
- Robot AL-76 Goes Astray
- Robot Archie
- Robot as a Service
- Robot App Store
- Robot B-9
- Robot calibration
- Robot combat
- Robot competition
- Robot control
- Robot Detective
- Robot end effector
- Robot fetishism
- Robot Football
- Robot Hall of Fame
- Robot Interaction Language
- Robot jockey
- Robot Jox
- Robot kinematics
- Robot kit
- Robot learning
- Robot locomotion
- Robot Magazine
- Robot Monster
- Robot Operating System
- Robot software
- Robot Stories
- Robot Torg
- Robot Wars grand finalists
- Robot welding
- Robotboy
- RobotCub Consortium
- RobotFest
- Robotic arm
- Robotic art
- Robotic book scanner
- Robotic laws
- Robotic mapping
- Robotic massage chair
- Robotic pet
- Robotic sensing
- Robotic surgery
- Robotic vacuum cleaner
- Robotic voice effects
- Roboticist
- Robotics
- Robotics Certification Standards Alliance
- Robotics conventions
- Robotics Design
- Robotics middleware
- Robotics suite
- Robotino
- Robotis Bioloid
- Robotoid
- Robotomy
- Robots
- Robots in literature
- RoboTurb
- Roboty
- Roderic Grupen
- Rodney Brooks
- Rog-2000
- Roger W. Brockett
- Roller (BEAM)
- Ronald C. Arkin
- Rota Vector
- Rottweiler
- Rough fuzzy hybridization
- Rover (The Prisoner)
- Rowa Automatisierungssysteme
- RS Media
- Rule-based system
- Runaway
- RunBot
- Ruzena Bajcsy

== S ==
- S-bot mobile robot
- S. Shankar Sastry
- Saburo Yatsude
- Safety engineering
- Samsung SGR-A1
- Samuel Anders
- Sandstorm (vehicle)
- Santa Claus Conquers the Martians
- Santa Claus machine
- Sarcoman
- Sarcos
- Saturn 3
- Saul Tigh
- SAVIOUR (robot)
- Sawfish harvester
- SCARA
- Science
- Science fiction film
- Scratch
- Scratch and Grounder
- Screamers
- Scud: The Disposable Assassin
- Search algorithm
- Sebastian Thrun
- SEIF SLAM
- Seiko Epson
- Self-balancing unicycle
- Self-management (computer science)
- Self-reconfiguring modular robot
- Self-replicating machine
- Sense Plan Act
- Sensitive skin
- Sensor
- Sensor fusion
- Senster
- Serial manipulator
- Serpentor
- Service robot
- SERVO Magazine
- Servo motor
- Servomechanism
- Seth A. Hutchinson
- Seth J. Teller
- Shadow Hand
- Shakey the robot
- Shigeo Hirose
- Short Circuit (1986 film)
- Short Circuit 2
- Shyster (expert system)
- Silent Running
- Silicate (Space: Above and Beyond character type)
- Silver Swan (automaton)
- Simbad robot simulator
- Simon Penny
- Simultaneous localization and mapping
- Singleton (global governance)
- Sinistron
- Siri
- Sitter (BEAM)
- Situated
- Situated robotics
- Six degrees of freedom
- Sky Captain and the World of Tomorrow
- Slider (BEAM)
- Small Wonder (TV series)
- Smart objects
- Smash Martians
- Snake-arm robot
- Snakebot
- SNePS
- Soccer robot
- Social robot
- Sociorobotics
- Soft computing
- Software agent
- Software engineering
- Speech processing
- Sphere world
- Spherical robot
- Spider-Slayer
- Spirit rover
- Spreading activation
- Squirmer (BEAM)
- ST Robotics
- Stage (software)
- Star Trek Generations
- Star Trek: First Contact
- Star Trek: Insurrection
- Star Trek: Nemesis
- Star Trek: The Next Generation
- Star Wars
- Star Wars: Episode I – The Phantom Menace
- Star Wars: Episode II – Attack of the Clones
- Star Wars: Episode III – Revenge of the Sith
- Star Wars: Episode IV – A New Hope
- The Empire Strikes Back
- Return of the Jedi
- Star world
- Stardust in Your Eyes
- State space planning
- Stäubli
- Stefano Nolfi
- Stepper motor
- Stereo cameras
- Steve Grand
- Steve Mann
- Steven M. LaValle
- Stewart platform
- Stochastic diffusion search
- Stochastic Roadmap Simulation
- Stochastic semantic analysis
- Strong AI (disambiguation)
- Subsumption architecture
- Super Robot
- Superman Classic
- Support vector machine
- Surena (robot)
- Sussman anomaly
- Sven Koenig (computer scientist)
- Swarm intelligence
- Swarm robotics
- Swedish Robotics Society
- Swimmer (BEAM)
- SwisTrack
- Symbol level
- Symbot
- Symbrion
- Synchro
- Synthetic Environment for Analysis and Simulations
- Synthetics (Odyssey 5)
- Synthoid

== T ==
- T-1000
- T-52 Enryu
- T-Bob
- T-Force
- T-X
- Tachikoma
- Tactile sensor
- Tadao Nagahama
- Takeo Kanade
- Talisman UUV
- Tape library
- Teaching dimension
- Technology
- Telecommunications
- Teleoperation
- Telepresence
- Telerobotics
- Teletank
- Tentacle
- Terminator Salvation
- Terror of Mechagodzilla
- Test pilota Pirxa
- Tetrix Robotics Kit
- Tetsujin 28-go
- The Adventures of the Elektronic
- The Amazing Screw-On Head
- The Big Guy and Rusty the Boy Robot
- The Black Hole
- The Bots Master
- The Day the Earth Stood Still
- The Devilish Blue Buffalo
- The Future Eve
- The Humanoid Project
- The Invisible Boy
- The Iron Giant
- The Iron Man (novel)
- The Iron Woman
- The Mechanical Man
- The Mechanical Monsters
- The Mysterians
- The Puttermans
- The Questor Tapes
- The Questor Tapes (TV series)
- The Sandman (short story)
- The Steam House
- The Steam Man of the Prairies
- The Stepford Wives
- The Stepford Wives
- The Terminators
- The Three Laws of Robotics in popular culture
- The Trons
- Thea von Harbou
- Theo Jansen
- Thermotrope
- Thinking machines (Dune)
- Thomas B. Sheridan
- Three Laws of Robotics
- Tik-Tok (Oz)
- Tilden's Laws of Robotics
- TiLR
- Timeline of artificial intelligence
- Tin Woodman
- Tobor
- TOK715
- Tom Servo
- Tomorrow Woman
- Tomotaka Takahashi
- Tonto (Metabarons)
- Tony Sale
- TOPIO
- Topo (robot)
- Tōshō Daimos
- TOSY
- Toyman
- Toyota Partner Robot
- Toys
- TR Araña
- Trace Beaulieu
- Transformers
- Transformers
- Transformers Hall of Fame
- Transformers: Dark of the Moon
- Transformers: Revenge of the Fallen
- Transmorphers
- Transmorphers: Fall of Man
- TREVENTUS
- Trevor Blackwell
- Turing test
- Turtle (robot)
- Twiki
- Type-2 fuzzy sets and systems

== U ==
- Ubiquitous robot
- Udo Frese
- UJI Online Robot
- Ultra Trencher 1
- Ultron
- Ulysses (robot)
- Uncanny valley
- Underactuation
- Unicycle cart
- Unified theory of cognition
- Unimate
- Unimation
- Universal Robotics
- Unmanned aerial vehicle
- Unmanned aerial vehicles
- Uran (character)
- Urology robotics
- User illusion
- UWA Telerobot

== V ==
- Vanessa Kensington
- Vecna Technologies
- Vector Field Histogram
- Vectorman
- Velocity obstacle
- Victor Scheinman
- Vijay Kumar (roboticist)
- VIPeR
- Virtual fixture
- Virtual Intelligence
- Visibility graph
- Vision Guided Robotic Systems
- Visual odometry
- Visual Servoing
- Vocoder

== W ==
- Wakamaru
- Wake-up robot problem
- Waldo (short story)
- Walker (BEAM)
- Walking
- Walking city
- Walking robot
- Walking truck
- WALL-E
- Wearable augmented task-list interchange device
- Web intelligence
- Welltec
- Wetware (brain)
- Whatever Happened to... Robot Jones?
- Wheatley (Portal)
- Wheel
- Wheelbarrow (EOD)
- Whegs
- White Box Robotics
- William Grey Walter
- Willow Garage
- Wired intelligence
- Wolfram Burgard
- World Robot Olympiad
- WSFN (programming language)

== X ==
- Xianxingzhe
- XM1216 small unmanned ground vehicle

== Y ==
- Yann LeCun
- Yaw (rotation)
- Yeti (Doctor Who)
- Yoky Matsuoka
- Yoshiyuki Tomino

== Z ==
- Zero (Tenchi Muyo!)
- Zero Moment Point
- Zeuthen Strategy
- Zhang Libin
- ZMP INC.
- Zoë (robot)
