= Legend of Dungeon =

2013 roguelike video game

- Developer: Robot Loves Kitty
- Programmer: Calvin Goble
- Artists: Alix Stolzer; Sebastiaan Van Hijfte
- Engine: Unity
- Platforms: Linux, Microsoft Windows, OS X, Ouya
- Release: September 13, 2013
- Genre: Roguelike Action RPG
- Modes: Single-player, multiplayer

Legend of Dungeon is an indie roguelike action role-playing video game by Robot Loves Kitty for Microsoft Windows, OS X and Linux. The goal of the game is for players to fight through 26 monster filled levels, grab the treasure, then make it back through all 26 levels without dying. Legend of Dungeon also features a unique artstyle and atmosphere by blending pixelated characters in a 3D world as well as having both a dynamic shadow and music system.

== Gameplay ==
The basic gameplay of Legend of Dungeon is a standard Beat 'em up fare. Players can utilize a variety of weapons to attack any enemies within their range. Players also have a large inventory and can hold onto multiple weapons at once, switching between them for whatever situation they may find themselves in.

Being a Roguelike, Legend of Dungeon's levels are randomly generated every time a player starts a new game. The game also features a permadeath system so if a player dies at any time in the game, they will have to start all over from the beginning. Playing with multiple characters allows for any dead players to exist as a ghost. Ghost players can collect spirit orbs from fallen enemies slain by their living partners allowing the Ghost to resurrect. Along with monsters, Legend of Dungeon also features a plethora of items from potions, weapons, food, and hats. Each item is unique in what it does and are in randomized locations for each new game. Items include, Swords, Beer, a Beehive hat, and a cat that shoots lasers from its eyes.

Dying in the game will allow you to save how much money you have gathered on an online score table.

== Development ==
Legend of Dungeon is a game by Calvin Goble and Alix Stolzer, a husband and wife development team working under the name of Robot Loves Kitty. Goble had worked on games previously, such as the IGF nominated Neverdaunt:8Bit, but this was his first time collaborating on a video game project with his wife. To reduce living expenses and finance game development, the couple sold their home and moved into a tree house they built on their friend Jaimie Mantzel's land on a Vermont mountainside. This living arrangement reduced their monthly outgoings to $150, excluding food. Though frugal, this lifestyle had its downsides, their solar panels could only charge their laptops for four or five hours a day and only when it was sunny. Living in the tree house required more effort, water had to be collected at a spring house, firewood had to be gathered and cooking on their homemade stove took more time. Stolzer estimates that 40% of their time was spent on basic survival, which slowed down game development.

The game was inspired by Rogue and arcade beat 'em ups such as X-Men and Teenage Mutant Ninja Turtles. Its visual design was derived from Goble's experiments applying bump mapping onto sprites, so that they would react with the scene's lighting. Stolzer believed the contrast between pixel art with high-quality lighting would capture people's attention and Goble was "blown away by how great the visuals turned out".

In November 2012, the couple were low on funds and so turned to a Kickstarter crowdfunding campaign to further game development. They set a target of $5,000, which was met within 24 hours of the campaign going live, the campaign ultimately finished with $32,999 raised for the game. An early access version of the game was released in March 2013, that same month, the game was exhibited at PAX East. The game proved popular at the three-day convention, with an estimated 350 people playing it over the course of the convention and 4,000 people stopping by at their booth. By July 2013, after spending over two years living in the tree house, the coupled moved back into an apartment and in September 2013, the full version of the game was released.

== Reception ==
Critical reception was mixed and the game currently holds a rating of 62 on review aggregate Metacritic based on 13 reviews, indicating "Mixed or average reviews". Hardcore Gamer praised the game's soundtrack and stated that it was "a perfect gateway game for those interested in Roguelikes, but who are intimidated by them as well." In contrast, GameSpot criticized the combat as being too basic. As of December 2015, the game has sold over 200,000 copies.
