= Jaydev P. Desai =

Indian roboticist

- Education: University of Pennsylvania
- Scientific career
- Fields: Robotics
- Workplaces: Georgia Institute of Technology/Emory University
- Doctoral advisor: Vijay Kumar

Jaydev P. Desai is an Indian roboticist, known for his research in robotic surgery and the control and coordination of multi-robot formations.

As of 2024, he holds the G.P. "Bud" Peterson and Valerie H. Peterson Faculty Professorship in Pediatric Research and the Cardiovascular Biomedical Engineering Distinguished Chair in the Wallace H. Coulter Department of Biomedical Engineering at Georgia Institute of Technology and Emory University. He is an elected fellow of the American Society of Mechanical Engineers (2015), the American Institute for Medical and Biological Engineering (2017), and the Institute of Electrical and Electronics Engineers (2018), and was the founding editor-in-chief of the Journal of Medical Robotics Research. He was previously at the University of Maryland, College Park.

== Education and career ==
Desai received his B. Tech in Mechanical Engineering from the Indian Institute of Technology Bombay in 1993 and an M.A. in Mathematics from the University of Pennsylvania in 1997. He received his M.S. and Ph.D. in Mechanical Engineering and Applied Mechanics also from UPenn in 1995 and 1998, respectively. His thesis "Motion Planning and Control of Cooperative Robotic Systems" was advised by Vijay Kumar.

Desai spent 1998–1999 as a postdoctoral fellow at Harvard University under Robert Howe, and as an assistant and associate professor at Drexel University before joining the University of Maryland, College Park as an associate professor in 2006.

== Research ==
His research is in the area of medical robotics. As of 2024, he gives his research areas as "endovascular and transcatheter robotics, image-guided surgical robotics, MEMS-based cancer diagnosis, pediatric robotics, and rehabilitation and assistive robotics".
