= EcoBot =

EcoBot or Eco-Bot, short for ecological robot, refers to a class of robots that can remain self-sustainable by collecting their energy from material, mostly waste matter, in the environment. The only by-product from this process is carbon dioxide, which would have been produced from the natural biodegradation of the fuel regardless. This carbon dioxide production belongs to the immediate carbon cycle of our planet and does not impose to the already increasing problem of the greenhouse effect.

== Autonomy ==
Autonomy in robotics has typically been linked with the ability of agents to compute and execute tasks, i.e. follow a set of rules given in an algorithm, with minimum human intervention. This is classified as computational autonomy, however it does not necessarily take into account the problem of energy collection and management. Energetic autonomy, therefore, refers to the ability of artificial agents to remain self-sustainable, with minimum or no human intervention.

== EcoBot-III ==
EcoBot-III

EcoBot-III was developed in 2010, as part of a European FP-6 funded project, by Ieropoulos I., Greenman J., Melhuish C. and Horsfield I and was the world's first robot to exhibit true self-sustainability, albeit in primitive form. This robot was capable of operating within an enclosed environment for 7 days, by collecting its food and water from the arena environment, metabolising these through the collection of 48 small-scale Microbial Fuel Cells and excreting the waste by-products at the end of the day. This work was presented at the Artificial Life XII Conference that was held in Odense, Denmark between the 19–23 August 2010 and the scientific paper (Ieropoulos et al. 2010) is published by the MIT Press.

== EcoBots I, II ==
EcoBot-II

=== EcoBot-II ===
EcoBot-II, developed in 2004, by Melhuish, Greenman, Ieropoulos and Horsfield at the Bristol Robotics Laboratory (BRL) UK, was the first robot in the world to perform sensing, information processing, communication and actuation phototaxis, by utilising unrefined biomass. In fact, it consumed dead flies, rotten fruits and crustacean shells as the fuel and oxygen from free air as the cathode. EcoBot-II operated continuously for 12 days after having been fed with 8 houseflies of the species Musca domestica [Ieropoulos et al. 2005a, b; Melhuish et al. 2006].

EcoBot-II is the first practical example of a Symbot (symbiotic robot) that exhibited artificial symbiosis – the beneficial integration between the live microbial part and the artificial mechatronic part.

EcoBot-I

=== EcoBot-I ===
EcoBot-I, developed in 2002, by the same group of workers at BRL, UK, utilised sugar as the fuel and ferricyanide in the cathode, to perform phototaxis (i.e. move towards the light) [Ieropoulos et al. 2003a, b; 2004].

The two EcoBots do not employ any other form of conventional power supply and do not require any form of initial charging from an external source. Instead, they are powered directly by the onboard microbial fuel cells (MFCs). This is in contrast with Gastrobot, which although it was the first example of a practical application that employed MFCs, it used onboard conventional batteries and required initial charging from the mains.

== Symbot ==
"SymBot" is a term coined by the University of the West of England's Professor John Greenman. It is short for Symbiotic Robot and it refers to the beneficial integration between a live part and an artificial mechatronic part, on a robotic platform.

A SymBot is a robot that can potentially mimic symbiosis, which is obligatory and mutually beneficial. Since one part of this association would be an artefact, it was decided to attribute the term artificial symbiosis to the system. This would come as the result of the integration between the robot and the microbes in the Microbial Fuel Cells (MFCs). The microorganisms, as part of their normal activities would be supplying energy to the robot which in turn would be performing various tasks, one of which would be to collect more material from which the microbes may extract energy. This seemed to be the most interesting approach in the pursuit for building an autonomous robot EcoBot-II.
