= Land Walker =

Two-legged robot

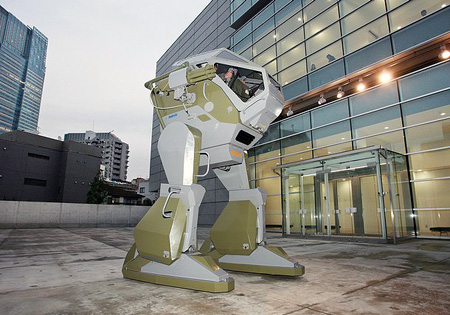
Land Walker

The Land Walker is the first 3.4-meter-tall (11 ft) bipedal vehicle. Despite its name, it does not actually walk—instead shuffling on wheels hidden under its "feet" at approximately 1.5 km/h (1 mph). It was invented by Masaaki Nagumo and created by researchers who hope to someday create similar machines to be used in the military and law enforcement.

== Design ==
The Land Walker stands at about 3.4 meters (11 ft) tall, weighing about 1,000 kg (2,200 lb). It "walks", or shuffles, at a speed of around 1.5 km/h (1 mph). It has a cockpit, similar to a small airplane, big enough to seat one human. Two cannons are mounted on the arms of the robot, which fire rubber or plastic balls.

== Enryu ==
The Land Walker is very similar to the biped robot Enryu, which was also created by the Sakakibara Kikai Co. in Tmsuk, Japan. The Enryu stands at a height of 3.5 m (11 ft). It shuffles faster than the Land Walker because it uses caterpillar-like tracks instead of legs. It was built to help in emergency situations, like rushing into a burning building, lifting heavy objects, and rescuing people. Its arms act like human arms, which is different from the Land Walker's arms.

== See also ==
- Mecha
- Remote weapon system
