= Jesse Sullivan =

American electrician (born c. 1966)

Jesse Sullivan (born c. 1966) is an American electrician best known for operating a fully robotic limb through a nerve-muscle graft, making him one of the first non-fictional cyborgs.

His bionic arm, a prototype developed by the Rehabilitation Institute of Chicago, differs from most other prostheses, in that it does not use pull cables or nub switches to function and instead uses micro-computers to perform a much wider range of complex motions. It is also the first prototype which enables him to sense pressure.

== History ==
As an electrician, Jesse Sullivan accidentally touched an active cable that contained 7,000-7,500 volts of electricity. In May 2001, he had to have both his arms amputated at the shoulder.

Seven weeks after the amputation, Jesse Sullivan received matching bionic prostheses from Dr. Todd Kuiken of the Rehabilitation Institute of Chicago. Originally, they were operated from neural signals at the amputation sites, but Jesse Sullivan developed hyper-sensitivity from his skin grafts, causing great discomfort in those areas. Jesse Sullivan underwent neural surgery to graft nerves, which originally led to his arm, to his chest. The sensors for his bionic arms have been moved to the left side of his chest to receive signals from the newly grafted nerve endings.

While the prototype is being strengthened, Jesse Sullivan does day-to-day tasks using an older model.

== See also ==
- Claudia Mitchell
