= Bow leg =

Highly resilient robotic leg

The bow leg is a highly resilient robotic leg being developed for running robots at Carnegie Mellon University's Robotics Institute. The key technology is the fiber-reinforced composite (FRC) spring that bends in order to store elastic energy. The leg's name comes from the device's resemblance to an archer's bow.

== History of the bow leg ==
Legged robots were initially conceptualized as a means of providing more effective transportation across rough terrains unreachable by conventional wheeled or tracked vehicles. Legged locomotion studies began in 1878, when stop-motion photographs of mammals were published in Scientific American. The first robot capable of actual "running" was created in 1980. Research in the field was significantly advanced by the establishment the Leg Lab, which was based at Carnegie Mellon from 1980 to 1986 before moving to the Massachusetts Institute of Technology (MIT) in 1987.

The major difficulties in developing these robots involve balance, actuation, power supply, and environmental sensing. Researchers have done extensive work on balance, and they often bypass issues with actuation and power by utilizing a form of umbilical cable that supplies energy and allows for the use of larger actuators. Environmental sensing, though, remains a significant issue, one not solved effectively enough to outdo typical animal behavior on rough terrain.

Recently, researchers at the Sandia National Laboratories (part of the United States Department of Energy) have developed more advanced hopping robots, using piston systems that enable vertical jumps as high as 20 feet. These hopping robots, however, do not fully compare to bow leg technology, as researchers' focus on hopping technology lies not in developing running capabilities but in maximizing jump height.

== Makeup of the bow leg ==
The bow leg is made of a curved leaf spring (the "bow" portion of the assembly), a foot on the end of the spring, a pivoting hip, and a string that compresses the spring.

The spring is retracted while in the air, enabling the leg to bend and begin storing potential energy. Upon collision with the ground, the string releases, allowing the bow to extend to full length, thus turning the stored energy into motion. At the device's hip, the leg pivots freely to minimize body disturbance torque.

The bow leg aims to provide the functionality of an entire leg structure using only a single spring. This simple construction minimizes energy loss and thus maximizes energy efficiency. The typical losses in a legged system are negative work and leg sweep. Negative work happens when an actuator applies force opposite its motion and so absorbs energy from the system accidentally. Negative work losses can be eliminated by a design that avoids articulation altogether. Leg sweep losses come from the need to accelerate the foot to match the speed of the ground moving past it, and are reduced by using a very light leg that does not hold much inertia for the system to resist.

== Terrain complications ==
The process of planning the device's motion is limited by the available information regarding the terrain in which the device is intended to move. In many experiments conducted with bow legs (including those referenced on this page), researchers assume both the geometry and friction coefficient of the terrain. In actual practice, though, either of these vital factors can be incorrectly measured or assumed, which can cause issues in the device's ability to traverse the terrain. Since only small parts of the terrain come into contact with the foot, necessary calculations can be minimized and false positives accepted in certain scenarios. In scenarios involving obstacles above as well as below the device, however, the issues are effectively doubled.
