= Tomotaka Takahashi =

1975-born Japanese roboticist

Tomotaka Takahashi (高橋 智隆, Takahashi Tomotaka; born March 27, 1975) is a Japanese roboticist and founder of Kyoto University's ROBO-GARAGE since 2018. Takahashi creates humanoid robots known for their smooth, fluid motions and sleek appearance. Having built many humanoid robots entirely by himself, from simple concepts to production, Takahashi's designs have been featured in several art exhibitions celebrating the creation of Astroboy, Time Magazine's Coolest Inventions of 2004, and promotions for Bandai, Panasonic, and Pepsi. He has also worked with toy companies to produce relatively inexpensive robots for the hobby market, including those for Kyosho (a Japanese toy manufacturer better known for their remote control cars).

In early 2008, Matsushita Electric Industrial Co. (Panasonic) unveiled Takahashi's 4.5-ounce, 6.7-inch robot mascot for Panasonic's Evolta line of alkaline batteries (the longest lasting of its type according to the Guinness Book of World Records), which climbed a 1,500-ft. Grand Canyon cliff as a publicity stunt/demonstration on May 24, 2008. The robot was powered by a pair of Evolta batteries, and used a tiny rope to ascend the cliff face, which took approximately 6 hours and 45 minutes.

Takahashi's largest robot to date is the Enryu T-52, which he designed for Tmsuk Co. Ltd. The Enryu (lit. "Support Dragon") is a 3.5m tall, 2.5m wide, 5t rescue robot that fully houses a human operator, but can also be controlled remotely if necessary via cameras located in the robot's head (including night vision), and on its front, back, and flanks. Its two, 10m long hydraulic arms have 6 degrees of freedom and are capable of lifting a car or other debris in the event of an earthquake, fire, or other disaster. The arms also come equipped with individual CCD cameras, useful when small, precise movements are necessary. It moves on caterpillar-style treads at approximately 3 km/h. As of 2006 the Enryu was still in the testing phase, and in July 2007 Tmsuk Co. Ltd. unveiled the completely redesigned Enryu T-53 (it is unclear what [if any] role Takahashi had in this redesign).

He leads Team Osaka, a collaboration of: Osaka City, VSTONE Co. Ltd., Osaka University, Systec Akazawa, ROBO-GARAGE, and ATR Intelligent Robotics and Communication Laboratories, established in 2003 to develop robot technologies in Osaka Japan. Team Osaka competes in various robot competitions and events around the world, such as Robocup (robot soccer). Team Osaka has won the Louis Vuitton Humanoid Cup in 2004, 2005 and 2006. They lost to the German team NimbRo 5–7 in 2007.

== Ropid ==
In 2009, Takahashi developed Ropid, a robot that can jump three inches off the ground. Ropid is a carbon fiber and plastic droid that weighs 3.5 pounds.

Ropid responds to voice commands; he can get up, walk, run and jump. Ropid's name is a combination of the words robot and rapid.

== Kirobo ==
Kirobo is a talking robot sent to space.

== Philosophy ==
Inspired by his childhood obsession with Astroboy and other fictional characters, Takahashi decided to study robotics after completing a sociology degree. Takahashi prefers to work on smaller robots, as they are easier to handle and people have more realistic expectations of them. Unlike machines, which are cold and uninviting, humans can relate to robots because they have bodies like humans or animals, which opens up new possibilities for communication, which Takahashi believes is their greatest strength.

His goal is to create robots with exaggerated movements, and to do that he prefers small, tough servos with metal gears, using the best hardware he can afford. The form, or outer shell, can be made in two ways: traditionally sculpted molds which are vacuum sealed, or through the use of CAD software and a rapid prototyping machine (3D printer technology).

== Commercially available robots ==
While most of Takahashi's work is not commercially available, such as his Tachikoma (not to be confused with the US$200 toy) and FT (female type) humanoid robot (specifications on these and others available via Kyoto University's Robo Garage website, see #External links), Takahashi has worked with toy manufacturer Kyosho to produce the MANOI series of humanoid robots. They come in a variety of styles, though they are based on the same mechanics as the Kondo KHR-1, known for its smooth and human-like movements. They retail for approximately US$2000 (though they are currently not being sold outside Japan), which is comparable to many other hobbyist kits.

=== MANOI PF01 ===
The MANOI PF01 (so-called PerFormance Type) is a 1:5 scale bipedal r/c robot, standing roughly 2 feet tall or 40 cm, and weighing 1.6 kg (battery included), with 17 degrees of freedom (neck x1, arm x3, leg x5). Rather than emphasizing the mechanical aspects of a robot's design, the PF01's internal parts are almost completely encased inside its anime-inspired plastic body, appealing to a broader audience than conventional kits. The robot is as sold as a do-it-yourself hobby kit, which includes more than 100 pieces and PC software for programming movements and gestures, and can store and play up to 50 audio recordings. Powered by 3 Lithium polymer batteries, the PF01 uses an accelerometer and other sensors in order to maintain its balance and avoid obstacles, and is capable of balancing on one foot and righting itself from a resting position. The robot can operate for 15–25 minutes on a full charge (time varies depending on the motions performed). It comes in a set color scheme of black and cream, but early models off the production line may be copper and gold, or silver and white.
