= Automatika =

Automatika is a robotics and automation firm based in O'Hara Township, Pennsylvania, United States, North America.

== History ==
Automatika was started by two Carnegie Mellon University graduates in 1995.

In April 2007, the company was acquired by QinetiQ North America, which has remained its current owner.

== Products ==
Automatika builds robots for defense, energy, and hazardous activity support. Automatika makes an urban combat and defense robot called the Dragon Runner.

== See also ==
- Military robot
