= RoboTurb =

- Type: Welding robot
- Purpose: Turbine blade repair

RoboTurb is a welding robot used to repair turbine blades developed at Universidade Federal de Santa Catarina. It is a redundant robot with a flexible rail.

The Roboturb project started in 1998 at the Universidade Federal de Santa Catarina initially with the support of the Brazilian Government and the public power utility company COPEL – Companhia Paranaense de Energia Eletrica.

Three phases followed, and now the project is mainly maintained by another public power utility company FURNAS – Furnas Centrais Eletricas.
