= Robomagellan =

SRS RoboMagellan or Robomagellan was created by the Seattle Robotics Society and is a small scale autonomous vehicle race in which robots navigate between predefined start and finish points. The start and finish points are usually represented as GPS coordinates and marked by orange traffic cones. In most versions of the competition there are also optional waypoints that the robot can navigate to in order to earn bonus points. The race is usually conducted on mixed pedestrian terrain which can include obstacles such as park benches, curbs, trees, bushes, hills, people, etc..

Intrepid: the only robot able to complete the 2007 Seattle Robothon RoboMagellan event.

Intrepid: side view, Seattle Robothon 2007.
