= Hybrid neural network =

The term hybrid neural network can have two meanings:

1. Biological neural networks interacting with artificial neuronal models, and
2. Artificial neural networks with a symbolic part (or, conversely, symbolic computations with a connectionist part).

As for the first meaning, the artificial neurons and synapses in hybrid networks can be digital or analog. For the digital variant voltage clamps are used to monitor the membrane potential of neurons, to computationally simulate artificial neurons and synapses and to stimulate biological neurons by inducing synaptic. For the analog variant, specially designed electronic circuits connect to a network of living neurons through electrodes.

As for the second meaning, incorporating elements of symbolic computation and artificial neural networks into one model was an attempt to combine the advantages of both paradigms while avoiding the shortcomings. Symbolic representations have advantages with respect to explicit, direct control, fast initial coding, dynamic variable binding and knowledge abstraction. Representations of artificial neural networks, on the other hand, show advantages for biological plausibility, learning, robustness (fault-tolerant processing and graceful decay), and generalization to similar input. Since the early 1990s many attempts have been made to reconcile the two approaches.

== See also ==
- Connectionism vs. Computationalism debate
