= TiLR =

Teleprescence robot

Telepresence internet-connected Low cost Robot (TiLR)
- Manufacturer: Robo Dynamics
- Country: United States
- Year of creation: 2007
- Price: $10,000
- Purpose: Telepresence

TiLR is the world's first enterprise-grade telepresence robot developed by RoboDynamics Corporation. The Telepresence internet-connected Low cost Robot (TiLR) enables a user to instantly transport to a remote location whereby the robot would embody the user in the remote location. The advantage of robotic telepresence is reduced travel and downtime as well as increase throughput and collaboration.

== Description ==
TiLR is essentially a video conferencing system on wheels. The user is able to commandeer the robot by remote control, driving the robot and controlling the pan/tilt/zoom function of the robot's camera. As such TiLR provides a means for frictionless ad hoc face-to-face conversations as well as remote audio and visual monitoring.

== Operations ==

There are two components to the TiLR telepresence system. The robot TiLR is stationed at the remote site. The second component is the TiLR Command Center (TCC) software that installs on any PC with a webcam and broadband connection. The user simply launches the TiLR Command Center and logs into TiLR. Once logged in, there is bi-directional video/audio between the robot and the TCC. The user is then able to commandeer the robot from remote, take snapshots, and even record the session for later viewing. TiLR Command Center is currently only supported on Windows XP/Vista. The next incarnation of the TiLR Command Center will be based on Flash technology where users will be able to log into TiLR and commandeer the robot from the World Wide Web.

== Development ==
TiLR was introduced in late 2007 by RoboDynamics following the MILO telepresence platform which was introduced in 2004. This makes TiLR a 14th generation telepresence robot developed by RoboDynamics. In August 2008 RoboDynamics kicked off their Beta Program by placing robots into various organizations in exchange for feedback. The very first program participant was the Google Lunar X Prize team of the X Prize Foundation. RoboDynamics planned to continue the TiLR Beta Program until the end of 2008.
