= Don Cuco El Guapo =

"Don Cuco El Guapo" is a pianist robot designed and built at the department of microelectronics of the Universidad Autónoma de Puebla (UAP), Mexico in 1992.

The exterior of the robot was designed by sculptor Gloria Erika Weimer and is made of a crystal clear plastic, its body is 1.97 m tall (6'5") and weighs 130 kg (290 lb). The robot has 28 degrees of freedom and was provided cameras for eyes. Don Cuco is capable of reading musical scores and play the music on a piano. To perform such tasks the robot required the application of frame grabbing, image processing, pattern recognition and interpretation or analysis of scene. The design team of 30 faculty 20 students at UAP consisted of physicists, physicians, electronic engineers, computer scientists, musicians and designers who worked 20 hours daily for six months to complete the project.

The brains of the robot are based on the ILA 9200 microprocessor design in 1985 by scientists and engineers of Argentina, Brazil, Colombia, Spain and Mexico. The arithmetic logic unit (ALU) was designed at the department of microelectronics of the UAP.

The robot has been presented and has performed in Mexico, Spain and Latin America before millions of people.
