= Non-silicon robot =

Non-silicon robots are robotic systems that include no traditional computers, integrated digital or analog solid state devices, or other solid-state electronic devices. The term non-silicon robot is often used to describe a robot that has some autonomous abilities.

As a simple example, a non-silicon mobile robot could consist of a platform base with drive wheels and steering system connected to a series of mechanical switches arranged around the exterior of the robot so that when the robot collides with an object the switches are triggered so that it reverses direction.

One of the most important areas of non-silicon robotics includes molecular and nano-scale machines.

== History ==
Any robotic system that was built before the advent of modern electronics could be considered a non-silicon robot. Automation has been a significant component of industry for over 150 years and pre-transistor control systems of the 1930s and 1940s were fairly sophisticated. These control methods are largely forgotten. Such systems use pneumatic, mechanical and electric control systems.

With some notable early exceptions (W. Grey Walter), in the modern era, non-silicon robots have been mainly confined to obscure research and purely teleoperated robots and have received relatively little attention. However, this is changing with the development of non-traditional computing technologies such as molecular computing (unconventional computing and non-silicon computing).

== Journals and conferences ==
- International Journal of Unconventional Computing
- Unconventional Computing
- From Utopian to Genuine Unconventional Computers
