= SEIF SLAM =

Sparse extended information filter in robotics

In robotics, the SEIF SLAM is the use of the sparse extended information filter (SEIF) to solve the simultaneous localization and mapping by maintaining a posterior over the robot pose and the map. Similar to GraphSLAM, the SEIF SLAM solves the SLAM problem fully, but is an online algorithm (GraphSLAM is offline).
