= Marvin (robot) =

Mobile Autonomous Robot Vehicle for Indoor Navigation (Marvin) is a mobile robot developed at Robotics Lab at University of Kaiserslautern, Germany. This platform consists of a differential drive, a bumper for basic operational safety, planar laser range scanners at the front and back side for obstacle detection, a belt of ultrasonic sensors for recognizing jutting edges such as table tops, a web cam, another fixed laser scanner at a height of one meter for a view free of clutter and a stereo microphone system for localization of sound sources. Its control system follows a behavior-based approach and its mapping abilities rely on a 2D geometric and topological strategy.

== Technical specifications ==
- Length: 72 cm
- Width: 72 cm
- Height: 120 cm
- Weight: about 80 kg
- Payload: about 100 kg
- Power Supply: 2 lead batteries, each 12V
- Operation Time: 3 hours
- Drive: Differential drive with 2 electric motors
- Max. Speed: 4.3 km/h
- Controller: 2 Maxon-Motor control system, controlled through a DSP-Board
- Computer: 1 onboard PC
- Sensors: 2 Sick AG Laser scanners, Ultrasonic belt, 2 Microphones, Camera on pan-tilt unit
