= ST Robotics =

Robotic arm manufacturer

- Industry: Manufacturing; Robotics
- Founded: 1981; 44 years ago
- Founder: David Sands
- Headquarters: Cambridge, England; Princeton, New Jersey, US
- Products: Articulated robots; Cartesian robots
- Website: www.strobotics.com

ST Robotics is a company based in Cambridge, England, and Princeton, New Jersey, United States. The company designs and manufactures low-cost bench-top industrial robot arms and purpose built Cartesian robots. The company has no sales force and sells their robotic arm products mainly through the Internet as "boxed robots" with distributors around the world.

== History ==
In 1981, David Sands formed the company Intelligent Artefacts which was based in Cambridge, England. One of its products was educational robot arms. The arms were programmed in the programming language BASIC and would run on any of the popular makes of computers of the time such as Apple (Apple II), Acorn Electron, Atari 8-bit, BBC Micro or the PET. The robot competed with others in that market like the Armdroid. As the language Forth became available on these computers, Sands wrote the first version of RoboForth which enabled the robots to run and respond far faster. A version of RoboForth was also written for Armdroid.

In 1982, Intelligent Artefacts was closed down and a new company formed, also in Cambridge, called Cyber Robotics who sold a redesigned arm known as the Cyber 310. The Cyber 310 had a 5 degrees of freedom (DOF) ability. Hundreds of them were sold around the world between 1981 and 1987. The robot arm was adopted in 1987 by Mike Topping as the basis for the Handy 1, a robotic helper for the severely disabled. Cyber Robotics was bought by the Bibby Corporation in 1982 and it was eventually closed due to lack of sales.

During the period that Intelligent Artifacts was in operation, many inquiries were received for more serious and professional uses of robot arms for which the Cyber 310 was not suitable. This alerted David Sands to the potential for manufacturing a bench–top robot arm series, some of which already existed, notably the Zymark.

Sands Technology was formed in 1986 by David Sands with Catherine George who took the role as Director of R&D. The company began to manufacture robot arms, such as the R12 Mk1, R15 and R16, which were used in various applications, including DNA processing and decommissioning nuclear reactors. In 1989, David Sands met Mathew Monforte in New Jersey and the pair decided to expand the company for the American market in 1991 and Sands Technology International was incorporated in New Jersey in 1992. The less personal pseudonym of ST Robotics was coined in 1997 under which both companies now trade. Also in 1992 Sands Technology formed one of the first joint venture companies with the USSR under Perestroika with the formation of Association Robot in Ekaterinburg, now dormant.

== Technology ==
ST Robotics uses technology which is based on hybrid stepping motors as opposed to the more usual DC servo motors. For some years the technology had problems from lack of power and motor resonance. These problems were solved with the advent of rare–earth hybrid motors, high voltage micro-stepping drives and incremental encoder feedback. The robots calibrate themselves by driving each axis slowly to a target sensed by a proximity detector. Incremental optical encoders then track along with the motors to check for errors. This is similar to closed loop control but differs from servo control in that the stepping motors run essentially open loop with the potential to close the loop in case of an error.

The ST robot controller uses two processors: an EZ80L92 runs the embedded RoboForth programming language and a Texas digital signal processor (DSP) to control the motors. The DSP is able to control all axes collectively with individual axes ramping up or down as necessary for a compound motion. At the same time it reads back the encoders data and passes this information to the CPU which also uses the DSP's timers. RobWin is a GUI project manager for PC to create and edit projects and save them on disk but RoboForth, the user's program and all data are saved in flash memory in the controller.

In 2018 A new version of the R17, R17HS was created using Teknic motors on axes 1,2,3. These are fast, high power servo motors using the same step and direction signals as used by the stepper motor drivers. Axes 4,5 and optional 6 were left as stepping motors. HT voltage was increased to 75v. At this voltage steppers get very hot so the stepper drivers were changed to Geckodrive G214V to reduce heating and provide a current reduction at rest as well as much quieter operation. As a result, angular speeds of over 180 deg/sec are obtainable while carrying a 2 kg payload.

Also in 2018 a new teach console was added. The basic teach pad is still provided free with a robot but its functions are limited. The new teach console is an optional extra. The teach consoles for most robots are very expensive and require heavy cables between the console and the controller. ST solution is to use a 7-inch tablet that communicates with the controller via Bluetooth. This enables the user to get very close to the robot for careful positioning without any cable going back to the controller. It provides ability to position in Cartesian coordinates both in world and tool modes.

In 2019 ST adopted the Igus Delta robot and markets it as the R18 using an ST Robotics controller. The controller uses the EZ80 in 24 bit ADL mode and robot speeds of 2 cycles per second are possible.

== Products ==
ST Robotics has 5 robot models

R12 - 5 or 6 axis low cost robot arm, 500g payload speeds up to 180 deg/s

R15 - 3 or 4 axis Cartesian robot system using Igus Cartesian robot system with an ST Robotics controller

R17 - 5 or 6 axis robot arm, 3 kg payload

R17HS - as R17 but using Teknic servomotors, 2 kg payload, speeds up to 180 deg/sec

R18 - Delta format arm based on Igus Delta robot with an ST Robotics controller.

Electric and pneumatic grippers and vacuum pickups are also available.

== See also ==
- RoboForth
