= Robotic sensors =

Mechanical sensors, often based on human senses

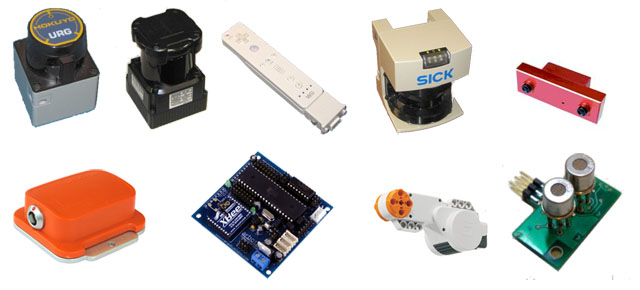
Types of robot sensors (Light and Sound sensors)

Robotic sensors are used to estimate a robot's condition and environment. These signals are passed to a controller to enable appropriate behavior.

Sensors in robots are based on the functions of human sensory organs. Robots require extensive information about their environment in order to function effectively.

== Classification ==
Sensors provide analogs to human senses and can monitor other phenomena for which humans lack explicit sensors.

- Simple Touch: Sensing an object's presence or absence.
- Complex Touch: Sensing an object's size, shape and/or hardness.
- Simple Force: Measuring force along a single axis.
- Complex Force: Measuring force along multiple axes.
- Simple Vision: Detecting edges, holes and corners.
- Complex Vision: Recognizing objects.
- Proximity: Non-contact detection of an object.

Sensors can measure physical properties, such as the distance between objects, the presence of light and the frequency of sound. They can measure:

- Object Proximity: The presence/absence of an object, bearing, color, distance between objects.
- Physical orientation. The co-ordinates of object in space.
- Heat: The wavelength of infrared or ultra violet rays, temperature, magnitude, direction.
- Chemicals: The presence, identity, and concentration of chemicals or reactants
- Sound: The presence, frequency, and intensity of sound.

Motion controllers, potentiometers, tacho-generators and encoder are used as joint sensors, whereas strain-gauge based sensing is used at the end-effector location for contact force control.

== Internal sensor ==
It is the part of the robot. Internal sensors measure the robot's internal state. They are used to measure position, velocity and acceleration of the robot joint or end effectors.

=== Position sensor ===
Position sensors measure the position of a joint (the degree to which the joint is extended). They include:

- Encoder: a digital optical device that converts motion into a sequence of digital pulses.
- Potentiometer: a variable resistance device that expresses linear or angular displacements in terms of voltage.
- Linear variable differential transformer: a displacement transducer that provides high accuracy. It generates an AC signal whose magnitude is a function of the displacement of a moving core.
- Synchros and Resolvers

=== Velocity Sensor ===
A velocity or speed sensor measures consecutive position measurements at known intervals and computes the time rate of change in the position values.

== Applications ==
In a parts feeder, a vision sensor can eliminate the need for an alignment pallet. Vision-enabled insertion robots can precisely perform fitting and insertion operations of machine parts.

== See also ==
- Robotic sensing
- Tactile sensor
- Robot locomotion
- Outline of robotics
- Robot App Store
- Liquid handling robot
- Glossary of robotics
- Index of robotics articles
- Mechatronics
