= Reza Olfati-Saber =

Iranian roboticist

- Education: Massachusetts Institute of Technology; Sharif University of Technology
- Scientific career
- Fields: Robotics; Control theory
- Workplaces: Dartmouth College

Reza Olfati-Saber is an Iranian roboticist and Assistant Professor of Engineering at the Thayer School of Engineering at Dartmouth College. Olfati-Saber is an internationally renowned expert in the control and coordination of multi-robot formations. He has also worked in mobile sensor networks, and innovative educational and outreach activities in robotics for disaster management and rescue operations.

== Early life and education ==
Olfati-Saber was born in Iran. He received his B.S. degree in 1994 in Electrical Engineering from Sharif University of Technology. He received S.M. degree in 1997 and Ph.D. degree in 2001 in both Electrical Engineering and Computer Science from Massachusetts Institute of Technology (MIT).

He was a postdoctoral scholar at the California Institute of Technology (Caltech) from 2001 until 2004.

== Awards and honors ==
- 2010 – Presidential Early Career Award for Scientists and Engineers (PECASE), National Science Foundation (NSF)
