= UJI Online Robot =

The UJI Online Robot is a robot library tool that was created at University Jaume I, Spain in 2004. It consists of a robot with three cameras that enable a user to remotely control pickup and placement operations of objects located on a board. The robot is capable of taking voice orders from users, locating, and retrieving books.
