= CETpD =

Applied research and technology centre

- Type: Public
- Established: 2003
- Location: Vilanova i la Geltrú, Barcelona, Spain
- Website: www.upc.edu/cetpd

The Technical Research Centre for Dependency Care and Autonomous Living (CETpD) is an applied research and technology transfer centre created for the Universitat Politèncica de Catalunya and the Fundació Hospital Comarcal Sant Antoni Abat on behalf of the Consorci de Servei a les Persones de Vilanova i la Geltrú, with the aim of covering the demand for research and development in the field of Gerontechnology, Ambient Intelligence, Assistive Robotics and User Experience Technologies.

The CETpD carries out applied research work and innovation on enhancing independent living of elderly and disabled people.

== Areas ==
CETpD AmI projects are part of the assistance field, mainly housing and health application. Clinical and epidemiological studies on gait alterations, balance alterations, and falls are conducted at the CETpD in order to gain insight into their causes and to find novel therapeutics. The CETpD also develops gerontotechnology, assistive robotics, and remote diagnosis devices.
