= Sarcoman =

Entertainment robot

The Sarcoman is an entertainment robot made by Sarcos that can be remotely controlled by a human operator (for example, a comedian trained to operate it) or computer-controlled for automated shows.

The system was used by Ford at all of their 1995 auto shows and exhibitions.
