= Photoreflector =

Light emitting diode with phototransistor

A photoreflector is a light emitting diode and a phototransistor housed in a compact package that can be used for detection of proximity and colour of objects.

They are a popular component in line following robots and other robotics.
