= Ensemble axiom =

The ensemble axiom is an engineering concept which states that if an engineer designs parts to cooperate with each other in an ensemble, he or she can simplify the parts and the ensemble will operate better.

This term is used within a research area called self-reconfiguring modular robotics, and specifically within claytronics, where it is stated as: A catom includes only enough functionality to contribute to the functionality desired in the claytronic ensemble.
