= TREVENTUS =

Treventus is a company based in Vienna, Austria that was awarded the European ICT prize 2007 in Hanover, Germany for inventing an automatic book scanner, called ScanRobot. This innovative scanner is able to scan entire books automatically, handling the books carefully.

== ScanRobot ==
The ScanRobot SR301 has a claimed operating speed of 2400 pages per hour. The book scanner scans two pages at once and turns the pages automatically using a vacuum to pick up the pages and using an air flow to turn the pages.

If a book is opened by 180° for the digitization often the binding becomes broken. To avoid such damage the ScanRobot uses a wooden made book cradle with a 60° opening angle. In this way the books are handled carefully, avoiding stress in the binding.

The build in ScanGate software is used for the digitising of books.
