= Wearable augmented task-list interchange device =

Simulator to test wearable communities projects

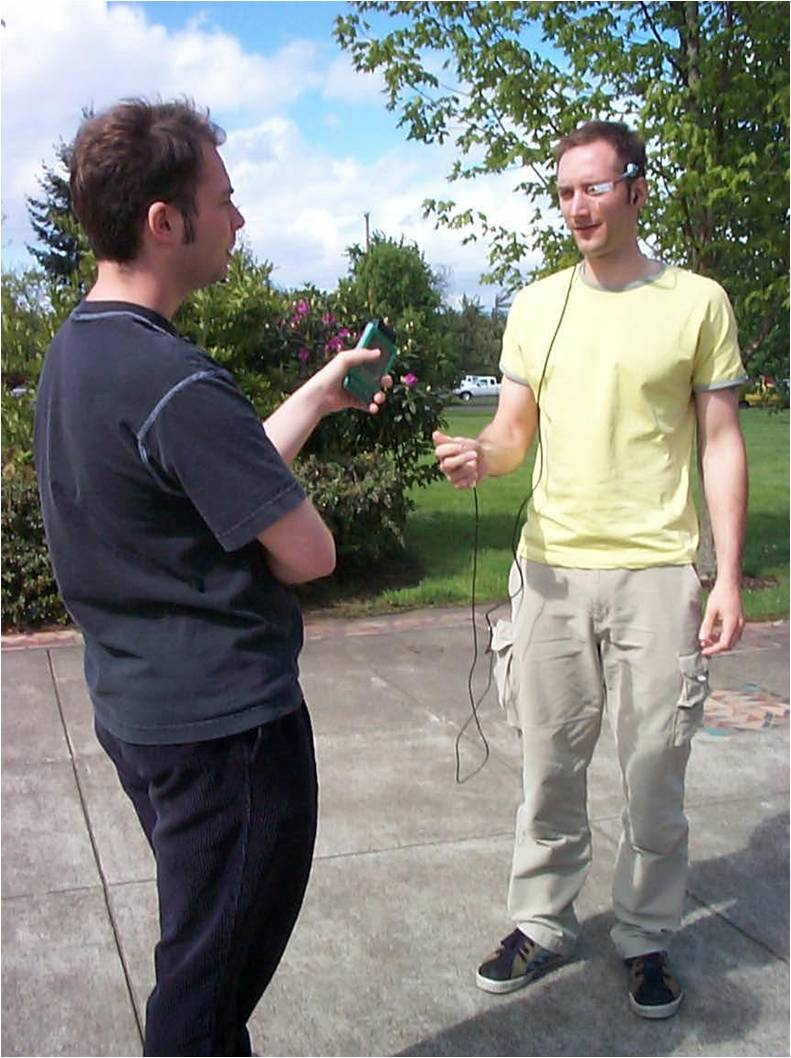
Demonstrating the wearable augmented task-list interchange device

Wearable Augmented task-List Interchange Device (W.A.L.I.D) system was designed by computing researchers of the wearable computing group at the University of Oregon as a simulator to test wearable communities projects. The first version was used in testing the Negotiation System described in When Cyborgs Meet: Building Communities of Cooperating Wearable Agents, and as described in Modeling Wearable Negotiation in an Opportunistic Task Oriented Domain. The WALID simulator is also modified for the trust domain.

The experimental system of WALID is developed to test the weighing of trust versus self-interest. The experiment was made easy by the fact that Oregon computing researchers live and worked in the same neighbourhood in Eugene, Oregon.

In this experiment, two individuals use their mobile devices to negotiate about and to exchange real world tasks such as dropping off someone's dry cleaning of returning a book to the library. It is based on the ideal of "doing a favour for others knowing that one day they will do it for you".

The WALID system utilizes personal agent software to find nearby community members to negotiate the exchange of tasks. Agents are made aware of the activities of the tasks and their locations via a user's task list. When an encounter occurs, negotiation is made and the tasks are exchanged if the negotiation goes through.

Ideas from game theory are employed to ensure that results negotiations are mutually beneficial; cooperation is conducted only if there is opportunity to enhance the user's objective.
