= Epson Robots =

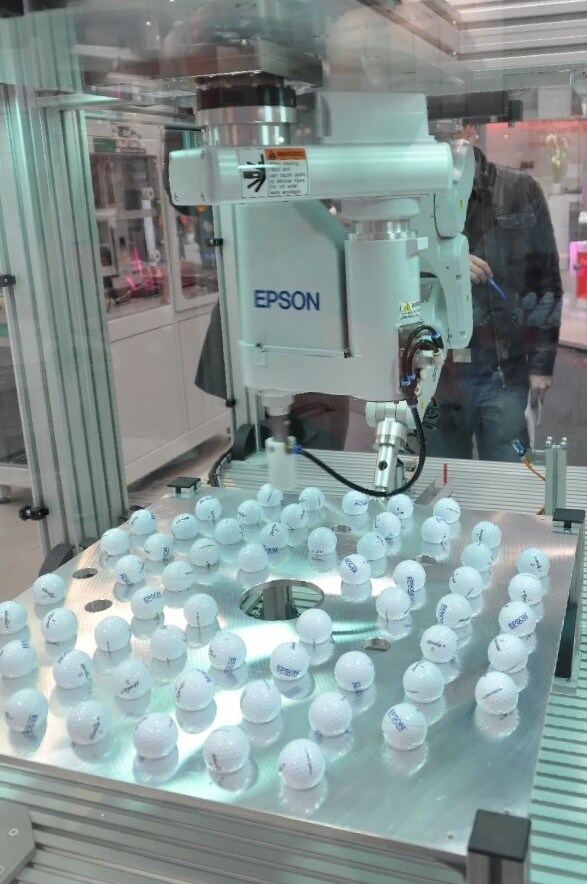
Epson industrial robot at Hannover Messe 2012

EPSON Robots is the robotics design and manufacturing department of Japanese corporation Seiko Epson, the brand-name watch and computer printer producer.

Epson started the production of robots in 1980. Epson manufactures Cartesian, SCARA and 6-axis industrial robots for factory automation. Cleanroom and ESD compliant models are available.

They offer PC-based controllers and integrated vision systems utilizing Epson's own vision processing technology.

Epson has a 30-year heritage and there are more than 30,000 Epson robots installed in manufacturing industries around the world. Epson uses a standardized PC-based controller for 6-axis robots, SCARA, and Linear Module needs. A move that simplifies support and reduces learning time.

== Epson SCARA Robots ==
Epson offers four different lines of SCARA robots including the T-Series, G-Series, RS-Series, and LS-Series . The performance and features offered for each series of robot is determined by the intended purpose and needs of the robot. The T- Series robot is a high performance alternative to slide robots for pick-and-place operations. The G-Series offers a wide variety of robots in regards to the size, arm design, payload application, and more. The RS-Series offers two SCARA robots that are mounted from above and have the ability to move the second axis under the first axis. The LS-Series features several low cost and high performance robots that come in a variety of sizes.
