= Movax =

Finnish excavator company

Movax is a developer and manufacturer of excavator-mounted, automatically controlled piling and foundation equipment and the inventor of the patented modular side grip technology. The product range includes a selection of excavator-mounted accessories like side grip vibratory pile drivers (SG), impact-type piling hammers (DH), piling drills (KB/TAD), multi-tool piling leaders (MPL) and stabilization leaders (MSL).

Movax equipment utilize the excavator’s unaltered standard auxiliary hydraulics. A single excavator can alternate between multiple different Movax attachments – this can be made even faster with a quick coupler. The range of different piles includes, but is not limited to, sheet piles, tubulars steel piles, H-beams, and timber piles. The devices can be used in virtually every type of climate and soil conditions. The most recognized item of the product range is the Movax SG Side Grip Vibratory Pile Driver, also available with the resonance-free variable eccentric moment. This means, that by cancelling the unwanted vibrations during start-up and shut-down, working in a sensitive environment becomes safer and less disruptive. A good example would be an urban environment with buildings in close proximity.

Movax excavator attachments are controlled via the Movax mControl+ (PRO or LITE), that also provides real-time information about the angle of the device, frequency, height, and oil pressure, etc. mControl+ PRO offers the automatic TipControl that works with the operator to ensure that the driven piles travel in a straight vertical line, so even less experienced operators are able to reach decent results faster.

Movax Information Management System (MIMS) includes mLogbook (for recording and analyzing the process data) and mFleetCare (for monitoring Movax's status).

Movax products are manufactured by Movax Oy Ltd. in Hämeenlinna, Finland. Movax Oy Ltd. is privately owned and a part of the Finnish Terra Patris Group. Hercules Machinery Corporation (HMC), located in Fort Wayne, IN, is Movax Oy Ltd.’s only licensed manufacturer for patented Movax Side Grip Sheet Pilers and distributes them exclusively in North America.
