= CRS Robotics =

Canadian robotics company

CRS Robotics Corporation
- Industry: Robotics
- Founded: 1982
- Successor: Thermo Electron Corporation (May 2002)
- Headquarters: Burlington, Ontario, Canada
- Products: articulated robot laboratory automation systems

CRS Robotics Corporation (currently operating as Thermo CRS Limited) was a robotics company based out of Burlington, Ontario, Canada. CRS Robotics designed, manufactured, distributed, and serviced human scale articulated robots, and laboratory automation systems. Human scale robots have approximately the same reach, speed, the range of motion, the degree of articulation and lifting capacity as a human being and are designed specifically to perform tasks that are hazardous, highly repetitive or generally unsuited for humans. Laboratory Automation applications are used to speed the effort of drug discovery for pharmaceutical and biotechnology customers.

CRS Robotics was notable in the field of automated lab systems due to their developments in high throughput and ultra-high throughput automated systems. Among other things, these developments included their advanced scheduling software, called POLARA, which was an open and extensible platform for the management and control of complex automated systems. As an example, a "good portion of the work" for "the preliminary map of the human genetic code was performed on CRS Automated Lab Systems".

The company commenced operations in 1982 as an engineering firm providing consulting services to Canadian machine tool manufacturers in the area of machine controls. The company sold its first robot, the M1 small robot system, in 1985. The company shipped its first laboratory automation system in 1997. In 1998, they introduced the F3 Robot, a 6-axis robotic arm.

The company changed its name to CRS Robotics Corporation in 1994. In 1995, the company completed an initial public offering. The company was listed on the Toronto Stock Exchange.

In May 2002, the company was acquired 100% by the Thermo Electron Corporation, (NYSE: TMO), and its name was subsequently changed to Thermo CRS. After the acquisition, the company still continues to develop laboratory automation systems.

== List of CRS Robots ==
- M1 (five-axis articulated robot)
- A255 (five-axis articulated robot)
- A465 (six-axis articulated robot)
- F3 (six-axis articulated robot)
- Catalyst 3 (three-axis articulated robot)
- Catalyst 5 (five-axis articulated robot)
- Dimension4 Family of Robots
  - VAL (Vertical Array Loader) (four-axis robot)
  - Flip Mover (1-, 2- or 3-axis versions)
  - LPT (Linear Plate Transport) (1-axis)
