= RNA Automation =

RNA Automation Ltd.
- Industry: Robotics, Industrial Automation
- Founded: 1986
- Headquarters: Birmingham, United Kingdom

RNA Automation, a member of Rhein-Nadel Automation, was established in Birmingham UK, in 1986, and has progressed into becoming the major supplier of parts handling equipment in the UK. The company operates in the area of specialized Automation Engineering, providing automatic parts handling equipment for high volume production in the cosmetics, pharmaceutical, electronics, food and metal working industries, with seven manufacturing facilities across Europe and North America and a network of sales and service outlets across the globe.

== Company History ==
Founded in 1972, Rhein-Nadel Automation or RNA operates worldwide in parts handling technology. Rhein-Nadel Automation is a member of the Rheinnadel Group, which has been based since 1898 in the city of Aachen, Germany. Rhein-Nadel Automation have four manufacturing sites in Germany and individual manufacturing plants in the UK, Spain and Switzerland, together with a world-wide, decentralized distribution and service network with 28 subsidiaries.

=== Time line ===
1968 — The department of the needle factory, so far only responsible for the internal construction of operating materials and machines, trades under the name Rheinnadel Maschinenbau and begins working for external customers.

1972 — Rheinnadel Maschinenbau now also uses the firm name Rhein-Nadel Automation GmbH and concentrates exclusively on the area of Feeding Technology.

1980–1989 — Rhein-Nadel Automation expands. The permanent establishment in Ergolding and the subsidiaries in Switzerland and Great Britain are found.

1990–1999 — Rhein-Nadel Automation continues to grow. The Spanish company Vibrant S.A. is purchased.

2000 — With RNA Automated Systems Inc., the first subsidiary outside of Europe to take up its commercial activities in Canada.

2004 — The Rheinnadel Group concentrates its activities on the area of Automation. RNA broadens its range with the components and continues to extend its development capacities.

RNA Automation specializes in automated feeder and specialist handling systems, offering vibratory bowl feeders, Linear Feeders, Centrifugal Feeders and Step Feeder systems. RNA also supplies a range of specialist handling equipment, including Vision Guided Robots, Tablet Inspection, Vision Inspection, Tray Loading, and Bottle Handling.

=== Technology ===
RNA supplies a range of vibratory, centrifugal feeders, linear and conveyor feed systems, and hopper elevator systems in different formats.

In association with Hoppmann Corporation, RNA offers a full range of tooled centrifugal feeders. The centrifugal feeder systems can be interfaced and supplied as a complete packaging line with further production transportation via downstream conveyor systems to subsequent packaging operations such as capping, labelling, flow wrapping, and cartoning machines.

=== Specialist handling ===
RNA are the sole agents in the UK and Ireland for the SVIA range of Vision Guided Robotic Systems. All systems have a Robotic arm for handling and manipulating the product, a camera system, and share the same PC-based control system and are, in most cases, integrated with a standard ABB robot controller.

RNA, alongside camera specialists Machine Vision Technology, has developed a tablet inspection system to inspect and sort tablets up to and over 1000 parts per minute. The specification of a tablet inspection system is as follows:

A 600mm diameter vibratory bowl feeder in stainless steel and a variable speed controller. A speed of 800–1000 tablets per minute Outputs onto a conveyor with a reject sort facility. With up to four double-speed progressive scan cameras and lighting mounted along the conveyor, A high-speed PC with a 17-inch LCD mounted in a SS enclosure. The system is designed to meet pharmaceutical standards The software complies with FDA requirements. All documentation is to CFR 21 pt. 11, with the fully validated version option.
