= Monte Carlo POMDP =

In the social class of Markov decision process algorithms, the Monte Carlo POMDP (MC-POMDP) is the particle filter version for the partially observable Markov decision process (POMDP) algorithm. In MC-POMDP, particles filters are used to update and approximate the beliefs, and the algorithm is applicable to continuous valued states, actions, and measurements.
