= Joanne Pransky =

American journalist (1959–2023)

- Born: 1959
- Died: May 2023 (aged 63–64)
- Education: Tufts University
- Known for: BattleBots
- Scientific career
- Fields: Robotics; Futures studies
- Website: www.robot.md

Joanne Pransky (1959 – May 2023) was an American robotics journalist, mainly writing on human–robot interaction.

== Early life and education ==
Born 1959, Pransky graduated from Tufts University in 1981 with a degree in psychology.

== Career ==
In 1996, she became the U.S. Associate Editor for 'Industrial Robot Journal' published by Emerald Group Publishing. She formerly served as the U.S. Associate Editor for Emerald's journals Assembly Automation and Sensor Review. Since its founding in April 2004 she was associate editor of Medical Robotics and Computer Assisted Surgery.

She worked as a judge on the television series BattleBots when it was aired by Comedy Central and was a judge for the First Robot/Human Arm Wrestling Competition.
