= CoroWare =

American software company

CoroWare, Inc.
- Company type: Public
- Traded as: OTC Pink Current: COWI
- Industry: Clean energy, Hydrogen, Carbon
- Genre: MicroCap
- Founded: 2003; 23 years ago
- Founder: David Hyams and Lloyd Spencer
- Headquarters: Woodinville, Washington, United States
- Key people: Lloyd Spencer (president and CEO)
- Website: coroware.com

CoroWare, Inc. is a publicly held company based in Woodinville, Washington.

== See also ==
- Cobot (collaborative robot)
