= Sense Plan Act =

Sense-Plan-Act was the predominant robot control methodology through 1985.

1. Sense - gather information using the sensors
2. Plan - create a world model using all the information, and plan the next move
3. Act

SPA is used in iterations: After the acting phase, the sensing phase, and the entire cycle, is repeated.

== See also ==
- OODA loop
- PDCA
- Continual improvement process
