= Roboty =

ROBOTY (Arabic: روبوتي) is a differential wheeled robot with self-balancing, motion, speech and object recognition capabilities. ROBOTY is also the first autonomous robot in Yemen, all of which will be primarily controlled by voice commands. The final goal of this research project is to build a robot capable of playing chess.

== History and background ==
ROBOTY was first introduced on October 21, 2010 by its inventor, Hamdi M. Sahloul, as his final year project. The seminar showed the components and capabilities of the robot. These capabilities included moving, speaking, hearing, facial recognition, and GPS navigation.

Various media and newspapers covered this event, including Yemen TV Channel, Al-Motamar, 26 Sep., Almasdar Online, Al-Sahwa, 22 May, Al-Moheet, Al-Hadath, Al-Tagheer, Al-Bida Press, Shabab Al-Yemen, Yemen Sound and Nashwan News.
