= Swedish Robotics Society =

The Swedish Robotics Society started in 1984 in Stockholm, Sweden.

== Founders ==
The founders of the Swedish Robotics Society are:

- Lee Sandberg with a background of cognitive science, AI, and 3D game engines.
- Leif Wikström built several robots.

The last robot built.

During the years 1980–1989, several robot controller cars were produced and a 3D robot-simulation engine for PC. Several smaller robots were built.

The Swedish Robotics Society has been covered by the Swedish media in daily papers, magazines, and radio.
