= Feelix Growing =

Feelix Growing is a research project, started on December 1, 2006, that is working to design robots that can detect and respond to human emotional cues. The project involves six countries and 25 roboticists, developmental psychologists and neuroscientists.

The aim of the project was to build robots that "learn from humans and respond in a socially and emotionally appropriate manner". The robots are designed to respond to emotional cues from humans and use them to adapt their own behavior. The project designers wanted to facilitate integration of robots into human society so that they could more easily provide services. The project aims to create robots that can "recognize" a given emotion, such as anger or fear, in a human, and adapt its behavior to the most appropriate response after repeated interactions. Thus the project emphasizes development over time.

Robots are expected to be able to read emotions by picking up on physical cues like movement of body and facial muscles, posture, speed of movement, eyebrow position, and distance between the human and the robot. Project participants want to design the robots to detect those emotional cues that are universal to people, rather than those specific to individuals and cultures.

The robots are made not only to detect emotions in people but also to have their own. According to Dr. Lola Cañamero, who is running the project, "Emotions foster adaptation to environment, so robots would be better at learning things. For example, anything that damages the body would be painful, so a robot would learn not to do it again." Cañamero says that the robots will be given the equivalent of a system of pleasure and pain.

The robots will have artificial neural networks. Rather than building complex hardware, the project coordinators plan to focus on designing software and to use mostly "off the shelf" hardware that is already available. The only part they plan to build themselves are heads with artificial faces capable of forming facial expressions.

The scheme for 2.5 million euros is financed by the European Commission (the executive body of the European Union) and is set to last for three years. Project participants hope to have a model of robot that can be used in homes and hospitals by the scheduled end date of the project.

The name Feelix is derived from the words feel, interact, and express.

== See also ==
- Affective computing
- Developmental robotics
- Evolutionary robotics
- Robot software
