= Ultra Trencher 1 =

Submersible robot

Ultra Trencher 1 (UT1) is (as of 2008) the world's largest submersible robot, used for burying submarine pipelines in a trench in the sea floor. It has a mass of 60 tons and measures 7.8 metres long, 7.8 metres wide, and 5.6 metres tall. It costs roughly £10 million. It can move at a speed of 2 to 3 knots when submerged and can trench pipelines with a 1-meter diameter in water up to 1,500 metres deep. It uses a pair of "jet swords" to create the trench by injecting pressurized water into the sediment.

UT1 is manufactured by the Newcastle upon Tyne company Soil Machine Dynamics.
