= IsaacRobot =

IsaacRobot is a biped humanoid robot, produced and realized by the IsaacTeam, a group of students of the Politecnico di Torino.

The project is a combination of several branches of engineering (mechanics, computer science, automation, electronics), and in March 2007 it was presented in its second version, under the name of I2Project.

Currently the purpose of the project is exclusively scientific and oriented to research, but possible fields of application are multiple and varied.

Above all, the studies that have been made give sensible cues to therapeutic areas, especially for people affected by motional disabilities; the legs, indeed, can reproduce the natural movements of human legs, utilizing their six freedom degrees.

Wide are the co-operations with physicians and experts in this field.

Isaac, besides, offers many solutions oriented to automation industry, embedded computer science, and Real Time software development.

Isaac is committed to the RoboCup, an international robotic-football competition, from the 2003 edition in Padova (except for the 2006 edition that took place in Bremen); it claims the second place in 2004 in Lisbon.

It has been a guest in the 2004 and 2006 editions of the SMAU in Milan.

The team has since been reformed in 2011 to continue work on a new prototype.
