= Vijay Kumar (roboticist) =

Indian roboticist (born 1962)

- Born: 1962 (age 63–64); India
- Education: IIT Kanpur (B.Tech.); Ohio State University (MSc, PhD)
- Spouse: Maneesha Altekar
- Scientific career
- Fields: Robotics
- Workplaces: University of Pennsylvania
- Website: www.kumarrobotics.org

Vijay Kumar (born 1962) is an Indian roboticist. He is a UPS Foundation professor at the University of Pennsylvania School of Engineering and Applied Science. He was appointed Dean of Penn Engineering on 1 July 2015. Kumar was elected to the American Philosophical Society in 2018.

== Early life and education ==
Kumar was born in 1962. While his family was from Tamil Nadu, he grew up in West Bengal, Bhilai, Delhi, and Bihar. Kumar earned his Bachelor of Technology from the Indian Institute of Technology before moving to the United States for his Master of Science and PhD at Ohio State University.

== Career ==
Upon completing his PhD in 1987, Kumar joined the Faculty in the Department of Mechanical Engineering at the University of Pennsylvania. However, he moved to the Department of Computer and Information Science (CIS) in 1989 and evolved his research in kinematics, robotics, and mechanical design. His efforts were recognized in 1991 with a National Science Foundation's Presidential Young Investigator Award. During his early tenure as a professor in CIS, Kumar developed new courses in robotics and received the 1996 Lindback Award for Distinguished Teaching. He was promoted to Full Professor of Mechanical Engineering and Applied Mechanics in 1997. In his research laboratory, the GRASP lab, Kumar and his team focused on developing an all-terrain wheelchair that could climb stairs and clear obstacles. He also worked on developing a 15 inch robot that could climb up and down stairs to assist firefighters and bomb squads.

== Honours and awards ==
- Fellow, American Society of Mechanical Engineers (2003)
- Kayamori Best Paper Award, IEEE International Conference on Robotics and Automation (2004)
- IEEE Robotics and Automation Society Distinguished Lecturer (2005)
- Fellow, Institute for Electrical and Electronics Engineers (2005)
- IEEE Robotics and Automation Society Distinguished Award (2012)
- George H. Heilmeier Faculty Award for Excellence in Research (2013)
- Member, National Academy of Engineering (2013)
- Popular Mechanics Breakthrough Award (2013)
- IIT Kanpur Distinguished Alumnus Award 2013–14, for his outstanding contributions to the area of control and coordination of multi-robot formations.
- The Joseph Engelberger Award by the Robotics Industries Association (2014)
- IEEE Robotics and Automation Award (2020)

== Personal life ==
Kumar and his wife Maneesha have two daughters together.
