= Claudia Mitchell =

United States Marine and bionic arm user

- Born: 1980 (age 45–46)
- Known for: First woman to receive a bionic arm

Claudia Mitchell (born 1980) is a former United States Marine whose left arm was amputated near the shoulder following a motorcycle crash in 2004. She became the first woman to be outfitted with a bionic arm. The arm is controlled through muscles in her chest and side, which in turn are controlled by the nerves that had previously controlled her real arm. The nerves were rerouted to these muscles in a process of targeted reinnervation.

Her prosthesis, a prototype developed by the Rehabilitation Institute of Chicago, was one of the most advanced prosthetic arms developed to date.
