= Robot leg =

Robotic prosthesis for replacing a human leg

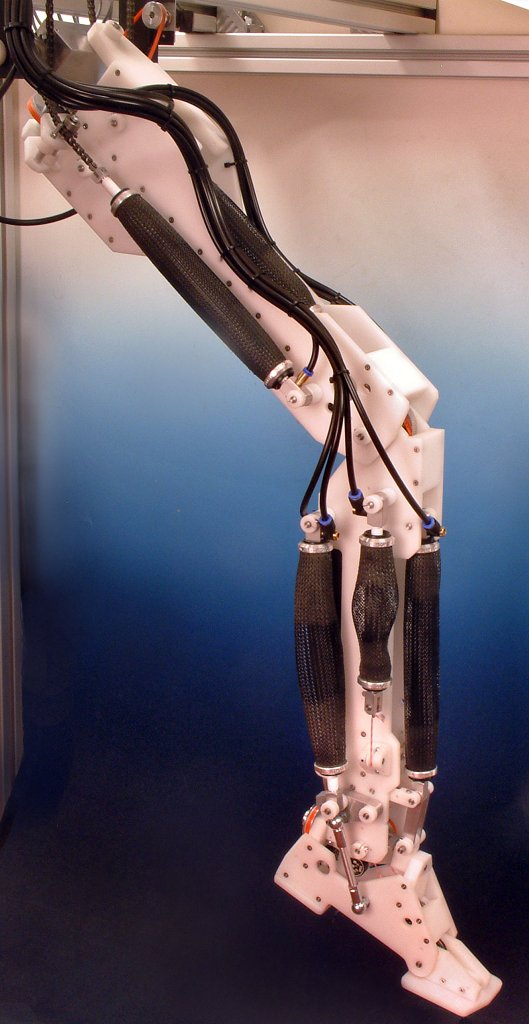
A robotic leg powered by air muscles

A robot leg (or robotic leg) is a mechanical leg that performs the same functions that a human leg can. The robotic leg is typically programmed to execute similar functions as a human leg. A robotic leg is similar to a prosthetic leg. However, a robotic leg can be controlled electrically or mechanically. To have the robotic leg emulate human leg behaviors, surgeons must redirect the nerves that previously controlled some of the person’s lower-leg muscles to cause the thigh muscles to contract. Sensors embedded in the robotic leg measure the electrical pulses created by both a re-innervated muscle contraction, and the existing thigh muscle.

== Mechanism ==
A robotic leg attaches to an individual who has had a lower extremity amputation—of a portion of a leg or foot. Doctors and technicians measure the remaining limb structure and of the person’s prosthesis to ideally fit the robotic leg. After they attach the robotic leg, they embed the sensors in the robotic leg that measure the electrical activity created by re-innervated muscle contraction, and existing thigh muscle.

== Applications ==
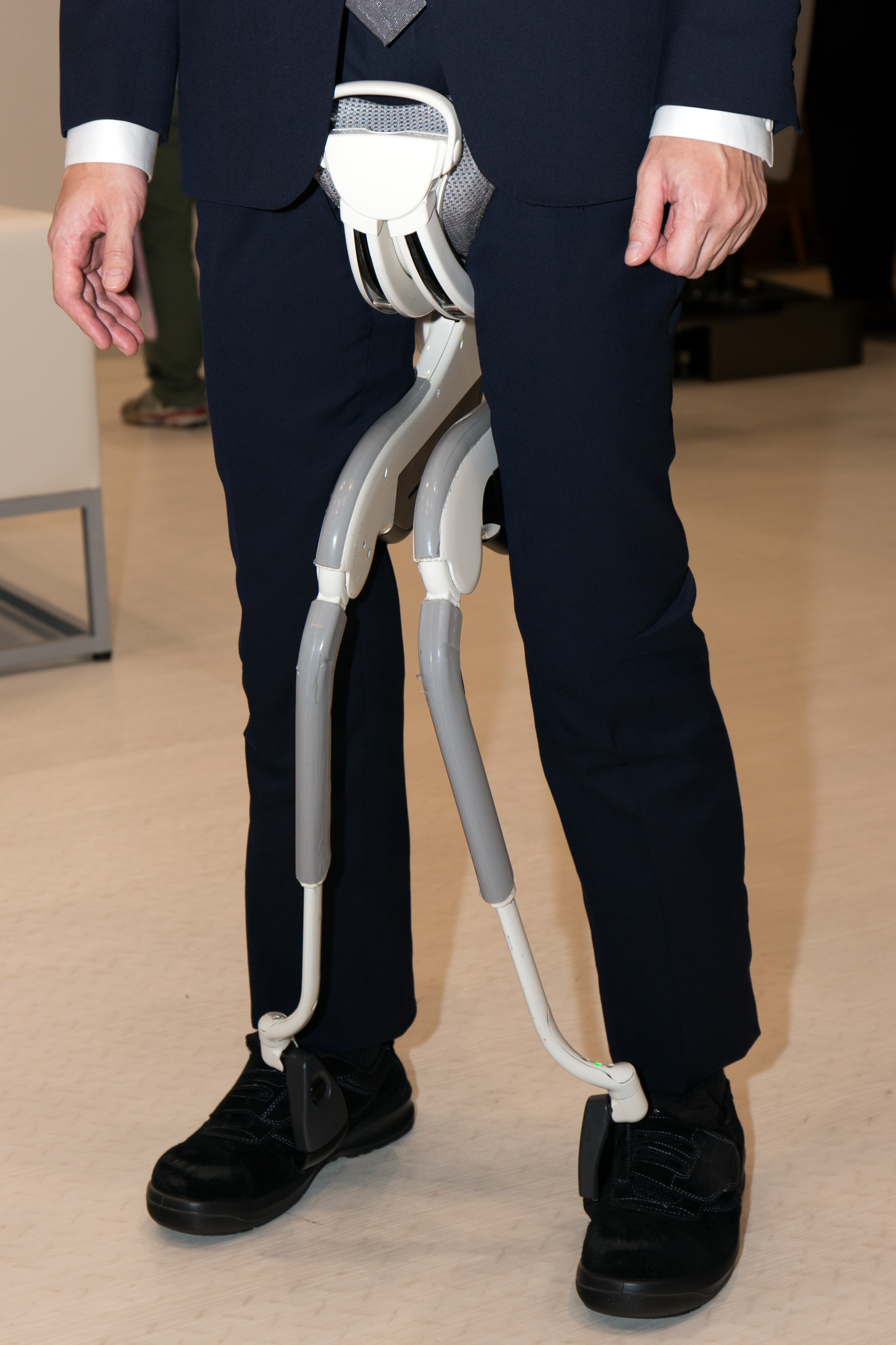
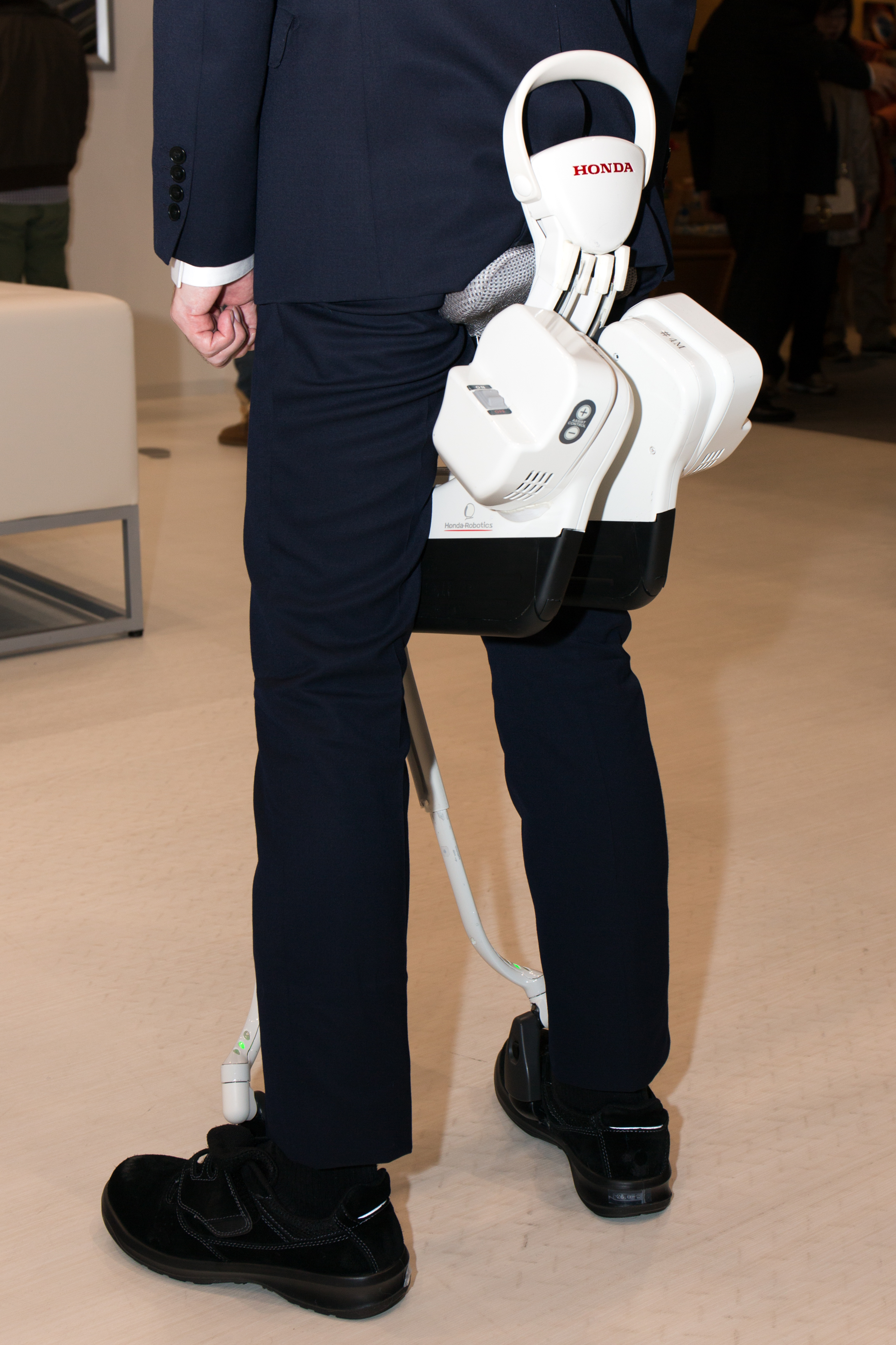
Honda Walking Assist Device

Robotic legs have become a popular target of research and development in the past few years. Robotic legs can be applied to people who have had limb amputation surgery caused by a major trauma, or a disease like cancer. Robotic legs have also seen much applicable use in military combat injuries. Massachusetts Institute of Technology (MIT) has been working to create a “bionic” or robotic leg that can function as if it had organic muscles.

== See also ==
- Robot arm
- Legged robot
- Leg Mechanism
