= Dragon Runner =

Military robot

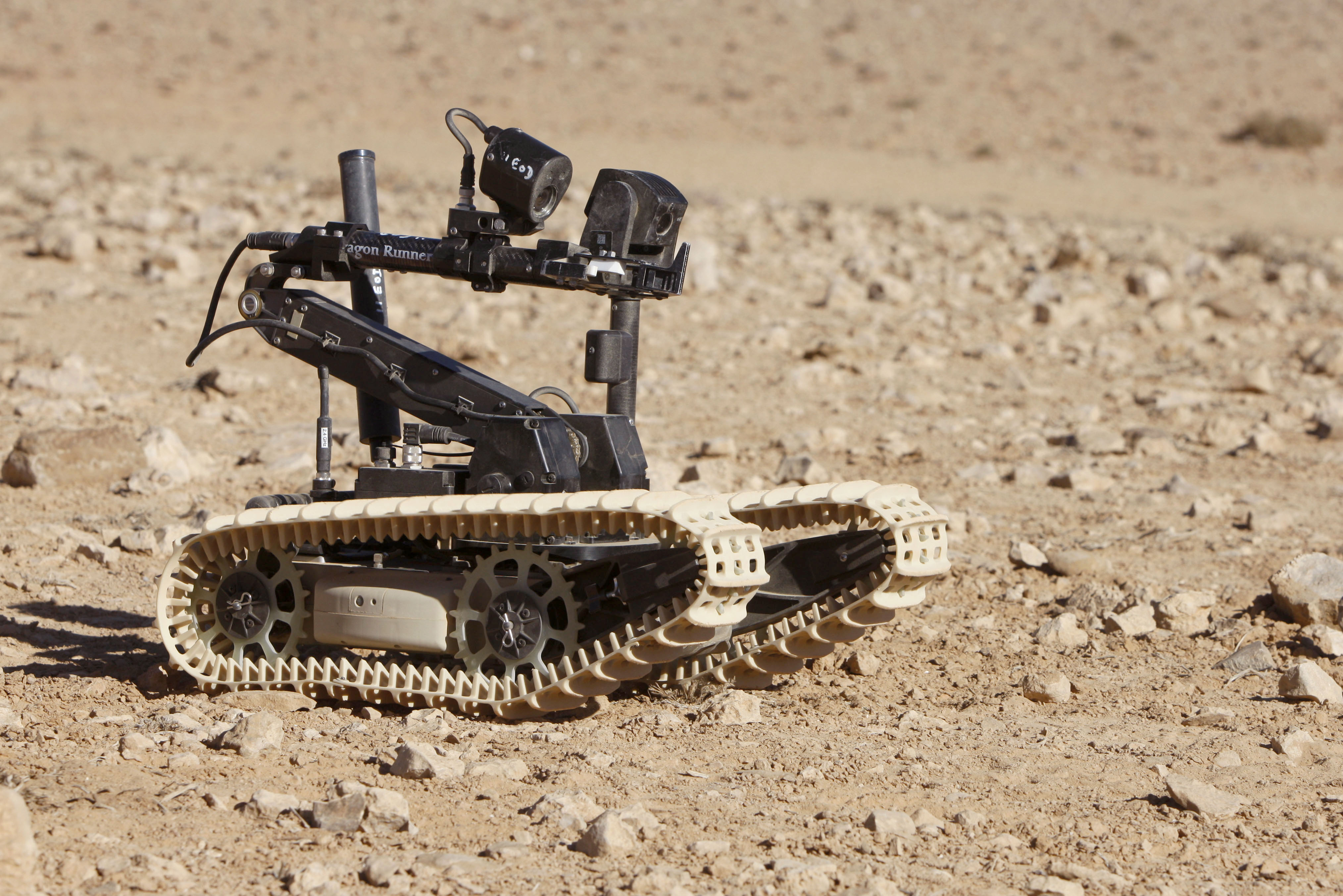
Tracked version on exercise in Jordan with the British Army in 2012

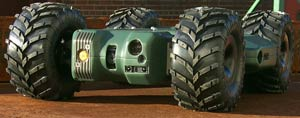
Original wheeled version

Dragon Runner is a military robot built for urban combat. At 20 pounds (9 kg) it is light enough to be carried and thrown. The original project was funded by the United States Marine Corps Warfighting Laboratory in conjunction with Carnegie Mellon University. It was designed at Carnegie Mellon University while the electronics and thermoplastic shell is developed and made by QinetiQ, Inc. Early development was conducted by the United States Naval Research Laboratory, including initial design, production and field-testing.

== Technical details ==
The robot has four wheels, is 15 inches (38 cm) long, less than a foot wide, and 5 inches (13 cm) in height. The robot is very rugged, and can be thrown over fences, up or down stairwells, from a moving vehicle at 45 miles per hour (70 km/h), or even from a third-story window. It does not matter how it lands because neither side is the right side up. However, it was not designed to drive up or down stairs on its own. Instead, Dragon Runner was designed so that it could be carried up the stairway.

In January 2010, under a contract worth £12m with QinetiQ, around 100 Dragon Runners were ordered by the British army to improve the ability of bomb disposal experts to find and deactivate improvised explosive devices on the front line in Afghanistan. The first in use were then already proving its worth against the threat of roadside bombs.

== Use ==
Dragon Runner is designed for areas that are too dangerous for or inaccessible by human soldiers, particularly urban terrain. Dragon Runner's front-mounted, tilting camera provides a video feed that is relayed back to its master controller by a wireless modem. It provides soldiers with a view around corners and other obstructions that prevent them from seeing hidden enemies.

Dragon Runner can be operated in three different modes:

- Drive Mode: The robot drives around, transmitting images back to the operator.
- Sentry Mode: Dragon Runner remains stationary, using a microphone and sensors that can detect motion up to 30 feet (9.1 m) away. If it detects something, it will alert the operator.
- Watch Mode: The robot remains motionless and relays images back to the operator.

Modifications include flippers that enable it to climb stairs and treads that can all be snapped on quickly and easily in the field by a soldier with no tools.
