= Giant Robot Project =

The Giant Robot Project is an undertaking by Canadian inventor Jaimie Mantzel to construct a large six-legged robot.

The robot is approximately 3.0 to 3.7 meter in height with a similar dimension in width and is made primarily from scrap metal and aluminum tubing. The machine is powered by a central electric motor system that mechanically transfers energy to the legs. To walk, the machine lifts three of its legs forward while pushing the remaining three legs backward against the ground in an alternating cycle. The system is designed in such a way that it can seamlessly adjust its direction of movement based on the rotation of the drive section located at the center of the machine. As of 2010, the robot had no onboard power system in place yet and during initial testing had to be tethered to external power sources.

Fabrication of the full-scale robot began in 2007 and intermittently continued until December 2010 when an initial and short "test drive" was taken. This brief test demonstrated the structural soundness of the design in general but also highlighted material weaknesses.

Complementing the construction, a series of video logs of progress made on the project have been uploaded to YouTube. Because of this, Mantzel has gained a following of supporters who occasionally make material or financial contributions to the Giant Robot Project.

A smaller version of the robot referred to as the 'Spider Tank' is also in development and serves as a scale model for many of the technologies and design features incorporated into the larger robot.
