= Gastrobot =

Hypothetical robot that can digest food

Gastrobot, meaning literally 'stomach robot', was a term coined in 1998 by the University of South Florida professor, Dr. Stuart Wilkinson, who stated that a gastrobot is "...an intelligent machine (robot) that derives all its energy requirements from the digestion of real food." The gastrobot's energy intake may come in the form of carbohydrates, lipids etc., or may be a simpler source, such as alcohol.

This type of robot ingests food and passes it into a microbial fuel cell (MFC), which converts the food into gases and other potential energy. The gases and liquids help fuel things such as a hydrogen fuel cell, which helps create more energy, and generates other gases that help power the gastrobot's mechanics.

== Application ==
Gastrobotics could allow users to deploy self-sustaining robots for extended times without human supervision. Common robots of today—powered by solar panels, batteries, or other energy sources—tend to become unreliable without human supervision for battery replacement, etc. Other robots must plug in to recharge, so they require constant access to an electrical outlet, which limits range. Solar powered robots are more independent but need a large surface area of solar panels to be efficient. This adds bulk and depends on weather conditions and clean panels to remain efficient. Gastrobotics might be able to live entirely off available natural resources. The main goal of this new technology is to produce robots that can go on missions where human supervision is not feasible or desirable.

Some examples include

- Automatic lawn mower powered by grass clippings.
- Vacuum cleaner powered by organic matter
- Fruit picking or soil testing robot powered by fallen leaves or fruit
- Exploration robots that are powered by their own environment
- Sea exploration: seaweed and algae
- Forest exploration: grass, fruits and vegetables
- Military applications: powered by surrounding natural debris, abandoned biodegradable supplies, and battlefield vegetation

== Technology ==
Gastrobotics energy sources mainly focuses on the use of a microbial fuel cell. Microbial fuel cells require an oxidation reduction reaction to generate electricity. A microbial fuel cell uses bacteria, which must be fed. The fuel cell typically contains two compartments, the anode and cathode terminals which are separated by an ion-exchange membrane.

First, in the anode chamber, the bacteria remove electrons from the organic material and pass the electrons to a carbon electrode. The electrons then move through the ion-exchange membrane to the cathode chamber, where they combine with protons and oxygen to form water. The electrons flowing from the anode into the cathode terminals generate electrical current and voltage. From this point, research is exploring using a hydrogen fuel cell to amplify the energy from the microbial fuel cell. The hydrogen fuel cell would use microbial fuel cell byproducts to create more energy without having to consume more material. Gastrobot requirements include:

- Harvesting: Must be able to gather food from real world settings and include some sort of arm or other mechanism that grabs food for consumption.
- Mastication: It needs some type of mouth to "chew" or break down food into smaller pieces for the system.
- Ingestion: An "esophagus" must move food from the "mouth" to the microbial fuel cell.
- Digestion: The microbial fuel cell "stomach" must produce energy.
- Defecation: The gastrobot must remove waste to avoid it building up.

=== Fuel ===
The best fuel source for a gastrobot is anything high in carbohydrates. Vegetables, fruit, grains, insects, and foliage are good candidates. However, it can also consume organic waste products such as urine, anaerobic sludge (biodegradable waste and sewage), and landfill leachate. Meat can be a fuel, but contains too much fat to be efficient.

== Benefits ==
The future of gastrobotics has many potential benefits to society.

- Robot independence: A successful gastrobot would not require human supervision to carry out tasks. Independence could improve efficiency by freeing humans to work on other tasks.
- Eco-friendly fuel source: The gastrobot, by breaking down food, potentially runs on a completely green fuel source. After the food breaks down into energy, what is left is H_{2}O and O_{2} (water and oxygen). This type of energy source might let robots function without adding to pollution.

== Challenges ==
The gastrobot is in its early development stages, and so faces many challenges:

- Efficiency: The current prototype is inefficient. It takes about 18 hours of "carbo-loading" for about 15 minutes of movement. This is useless in any real world application.
- Foraging: Development must make the gastrobot able to locate, identify, and acquire food.
- Intelligence: Gastrobots require more processing power and sophisticated software to function efficiently in many real world applications. They must be able to locate, identify and acquire food with potential for consumption. They must also be able to identify and adapt to new environments while following instructions for their mission.
- Maneuverability: The current prototype has very little maneuverability. For the robot to move around, it must also be able to grab, harvest, and move potential fuel sources. Furthermore, the robot must regulate the amount of food it eats at a time—like an electronic appetite. If the robot consumes too much organic material it may overload and clog. Furthermore, it must know when to search for food.

As robots become more independent they must be more compliant. If a robot is out on a "mission" it must be sensitive to others around it instead of having a "complete task at all costs" mentality.

== See also ==
- Digesting Duck, Vaucanson's fabricated 18th century forerunner.
- Bender – a cartoon robot from the year 3000 that 'lives' on common alcohol.
- Doraemon – an anime robot from the 22nd century that consumes dorayaki.
- The film Runaway – features a robot that eats slugs.
