= T-52 Enryu =

The T-52 Enryu is a rescue robot.

A rescue robot is a robot that is made to help the humans in areas that have been hit by a natural disaster such as an earthquake, tsunami, etc., or by a man-made disaster such as fires, car crashes, etc. There are many different types of rescue robots of different sizes and shapes. The T-52 Enryu (T-52援竜; lit. rescue dragon), sometimes referred to as "HyperRescueRobot", is a hydraulically operated robot, built to cut a path through debris for rescue workers, in the wake of an earthquake or other catastrophe.

As of 2006, the robot conducted a performance test at Nagaoka University of Technology and successfully lifted a car from a snowbank.

TMSUK developed the robot in cooperation with Kyoto University, the Kitakyushu Fire Department and Japan's National Research Institute of Fire and Disaster in Tokyo. The 3.5-metre-tall robot can either be driven from a cockpit positioned at the front of the robot or it can be controlled remotely as like its cousin the Banryu, it contains multiple CCD cameras which transmit to the remote driver - in this case, it has seven 6.8-megapixel CCD cams mounted on its "head", "torso" and "arms".

== Characteristics of T-52 Enryu ==
T-52 Enryu measures 3.5 meters in height, 2.4 meters in width, and weighs 5 tons. It has two 6-meter arms. Each arm could carry 500 kilograms and both arms combined can lift up to one ton. The robot runs on diesel fuel. It has a top speed of 3 km/h which is equivalent to most construction machines.
The robot does not have a program installed in it, need to be taught how to operate, or has any sensors to help it see because the human controls it. It does have a camera to help the human see where it is going when the human is using a remote to control it.

== History ==
T-52 Enryu was created by the TMSUK company in Munakata-City, Fukuoka, Japan. Founded in 2000, TMSUK has 20 employees. The T-52 was created in 2004. The urge to build such advanced rescue robots begun after experts realized the amount of damage natural disasters did in the past decade alone. According to the Centre for Research on Epidemiology of Disasters (CRED) there was 3852 disasters in the last decade in which over three quarters of a million of people died, and cost an amount $960 billion to fix damaged buildings and help people pay their hospital bills.

== Operation ==
There is two methods to operate the T-52 Enryu: Operator sitting inside the robot and by remote control device. In the first method, the driver has to climb inside the robot and manually control it just like if it was a construction machine. The downside of this method is that in some cases, it is too dangerous for a person to be inside the robot because other building could collapse onto the robot and smash it, or in case of a car crash, there could be the risk of explosions. The second method is using a control remote to direct T-52 Enryu. When it comes to controlling the robot with the remote control device there is two options:

1. Master-slave control: This method directly transmits the moves of the human to the machine from a control center which gives the machine a more human-like motion. Since the operator does not have to be inside the robot to control it, this method is very efficient when there is danger of further collapse in the damaged area.
1. Joystick control: This method is used when a more precise motion is needed. This method allows the control of single joints of the robot making it more precise than that of master-slave control.

== T-52 Enryu in action ==
The T-52 Enryu is used to lift heavy objects in areas damaged due to a natural disaster or car crashes. It can cut through metals and other materials to free people who are trapped. Also it helps clear the road for other vehicles to pass through. Last, T-52 Enryu can rip doors from cars to allow people to exit. It is mostly used in areas where it might be too dangerous for people to go to.
