= Mordechai Ben-Ari =

Israeli computer scientist

Mordechai (Moti) Ben-Ari
- מרדכי (מוטי) בן-ארי
- Known for: Textbooks in computer science, development of educational software tools, research in computer science education
- Awards: ACM SIGCSE Award for Outstanding Contributions to Computer Science Education, ACM Distinguished Educator, ACM Karl V. Karlstrom Award
- Scientific career
- Fields: Computer science education
- Workplaces: Weizmann Institute of Science

Mordechai (Moti) Ben-Ari (Hebrew: מרדכי (מוטי) בן-ארי) is a professor emeritus of computer science education at the Weizmann Institute of Science.

Ben-Ari has published numerous textbooks in computer science, developed software tools for teaching computer science, and written influential papers in computer science education. His primary focus has been on books and tools for learning theoretical concepts in computer science and mathematics, such as concurrency and mathematical logic.

In collaboration with the University of Joensuu (now part of the University of Eastern Finland) his group developed the Jeliot program animation system for teaching elementary computer science and programming.

He has collaborated with the École Polytechnique Fédérale de Lausanne on educational robotics using the Thymio robot.

Ben-Ari has published three books under the Springer Open Access program:

- Elements of Robotics with Francesco Mondada.
- Mathematical Surprises.
- The Geometry of Ellipses and Planetary Orbits.

Ben-Ari received ACM SIGCSE Award for Outstanding Contributions for Computer Science Education in 2004, was named an ACM Distinguished Educator in 2009 and received the ACM Karl V. Karlstrom Award in 2019.
