= Webots =

Open-source robot simulator

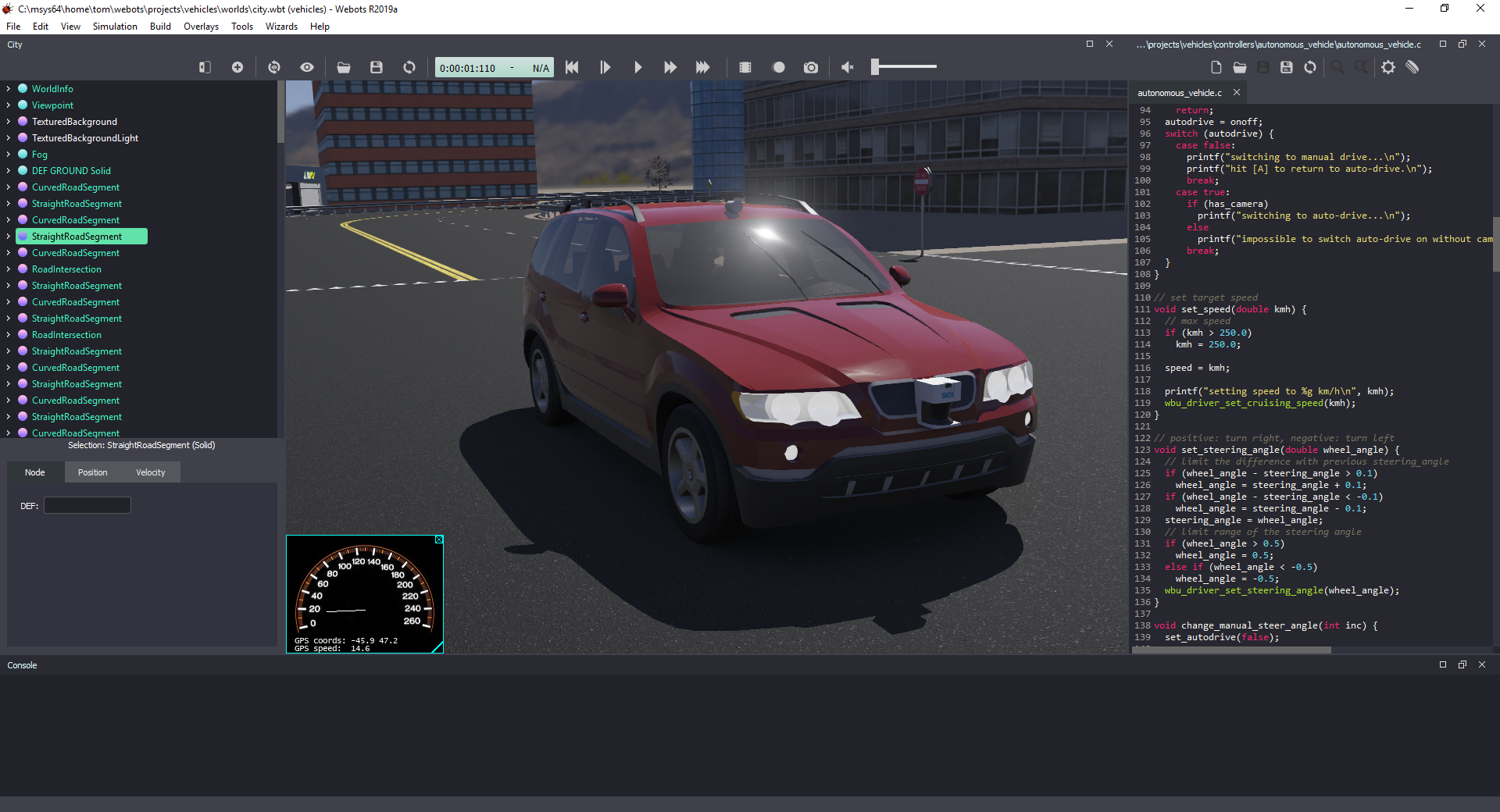
- Autonomous car in Webots
- Developer: Cyberbotics Ltd.
- Stable release: Webots R2025a / January 31st, 2025
- Operating system: Windows, Linux, macOS
- Type: Robotics simulator
- License: Apache 2
- Website: www.cyberbotics.com
- Repository: github.com/cyberbotics/webots

Webots is a free and open-source 3D robot simulator used in industry, education and research.

The Webots project started in 1996, initially developed by Dr. Olivier Michel at the Swiss Federal Institute of Technology (EPFL) in Lausanne, Switzerland and then from 1998 by Cyberbotics Ltd. as a proprietary licensed software. Since December 2018, it is released under the free and open-source Apache 2 license.

Webots includes a large collection of freely modifiable models of robots, sensors, actuators and objects. In addition, it is also possible to build new models from scratch or import them from 3D CAD software. When designing a robot model, the user specifies both the graphical and the physical properties of the objects. The graphical properties include the shape, dimensions, position and orientation, colors, and texture of the object. The physical properties include the mass, friction factor, as well as the spring and damping constants. Simple fluid dynamics is present in the software.

Webots uses a fork of the ODE (Open Dynamics Engine) for detecting of collisions and simulating rigid body dynamics. The ODE library allows one to accurately simulate physical properties of objects such as velocity, inertia and friction.

Webots includes a set of sensors and actuators frequently used in robotic experiments, e.g. lidars, radars, proximity sensors, light sensors, touch sensors, GPS, accelerometers, cameras, emitters and receivers, servo motors (rotational & linear), position and force sensor, LEDs, grippers, gyros, compass, IMU, etc.

The robot controller programs can be written outside of Webots in C, C++, Python, ROS, Java and MATLAB using a simple API.

Webots offers the possibility to take screenshots and record simulations. Webots worlds are stored in cross-platform *.wbt files whose format is based on the VRML language. One can also import and export Webots worlds and objects in the VRML format. Users can interact with a running simulation by moving robots and other objects with the mouse. Webots can also stream a simulation on web browsers using WebGL.

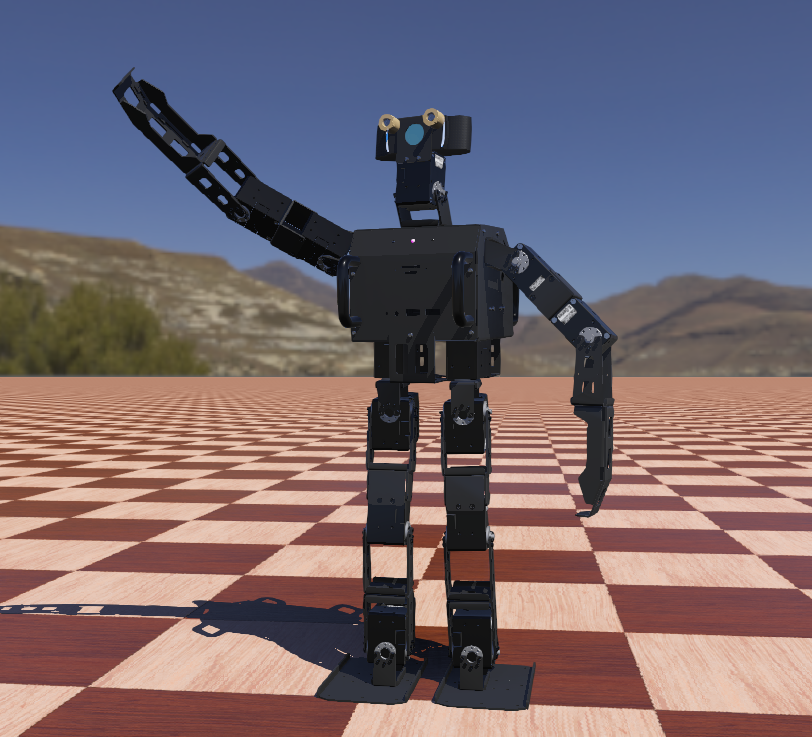
Simulation of a Robotis-Op3in Webots

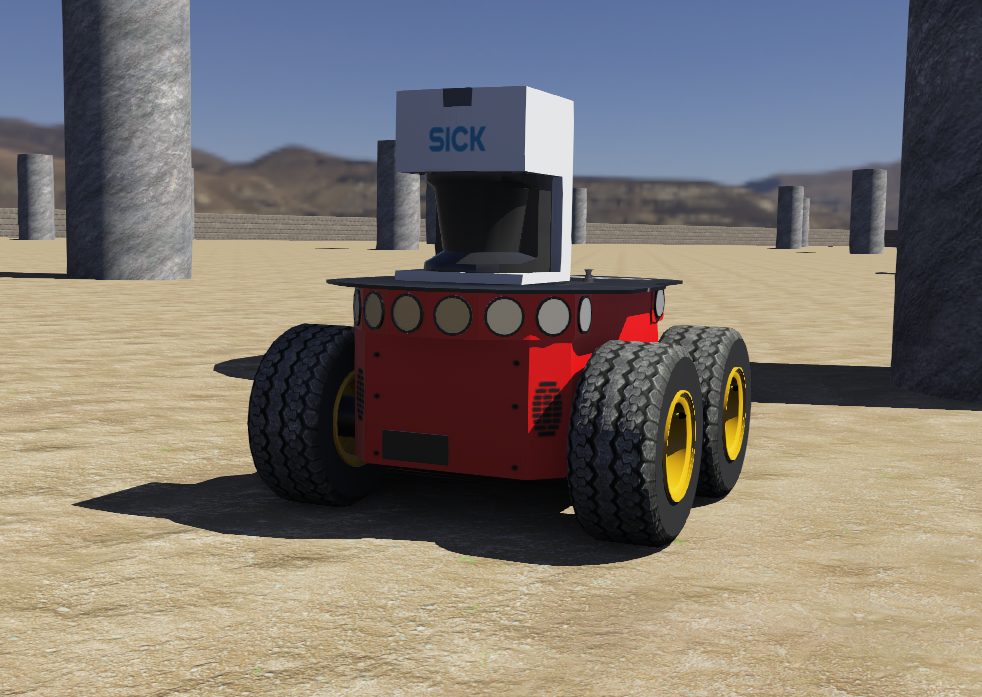
Simulation of a Pioneer 3-AT (Adept Mobile Robots) mounted with a SICK LMS 291 in Webots

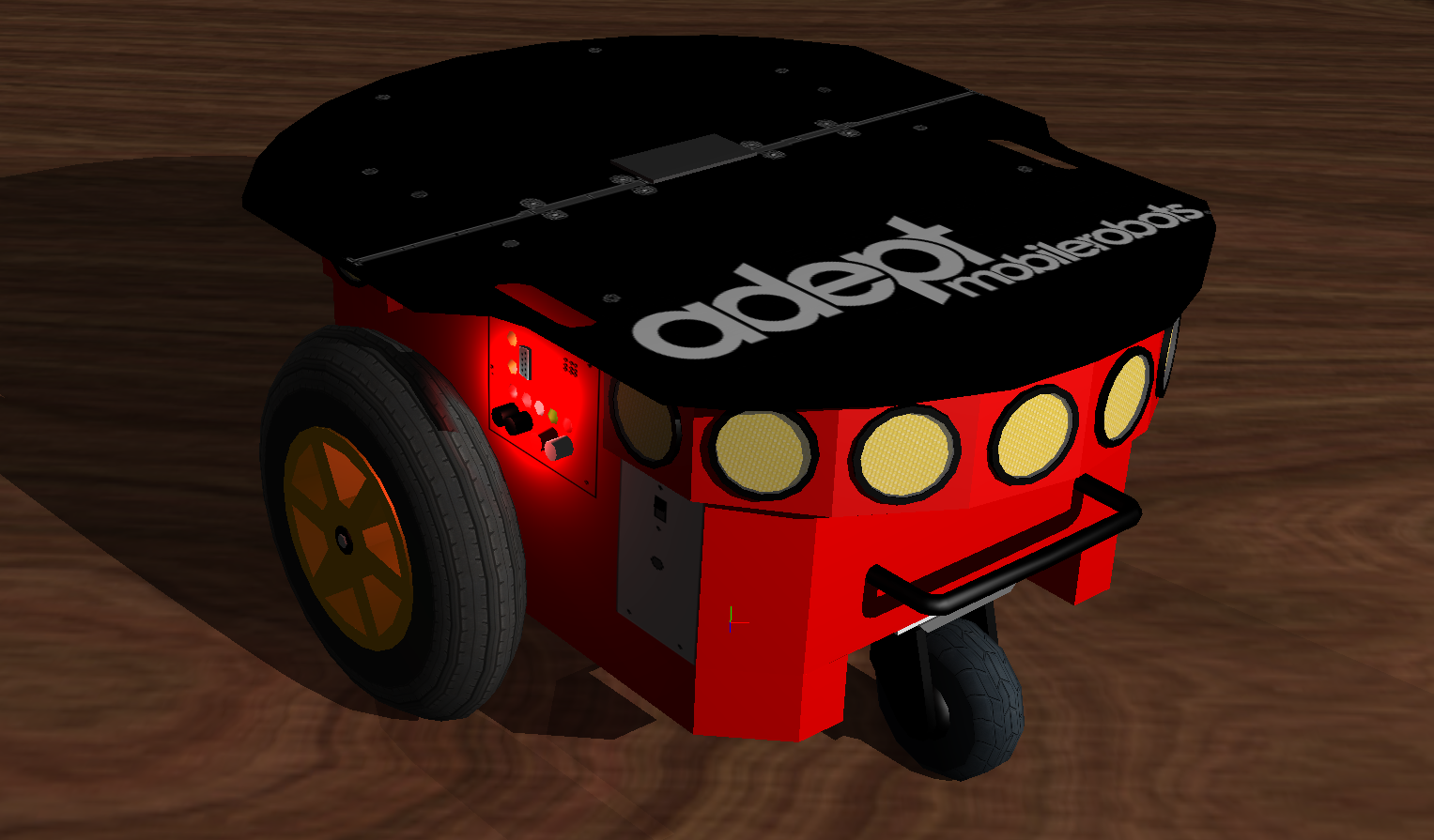
Simulation of a Pioneer 3-DX (Adept Mobile Robots) in Webots

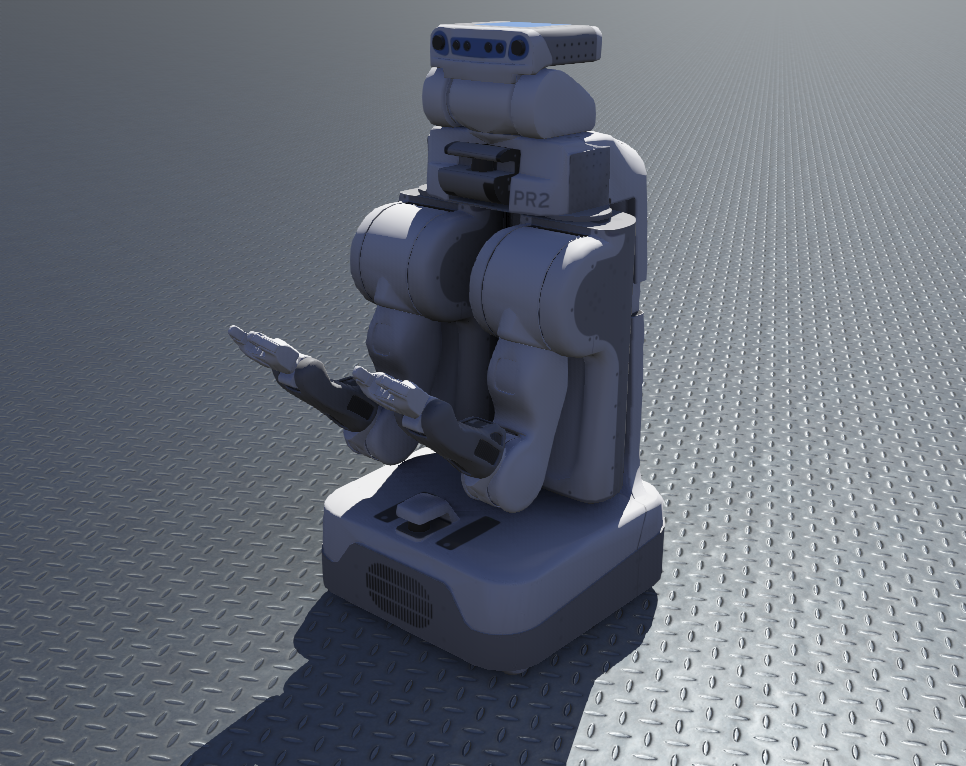
A simulation model of the PR2 robot in Webots.

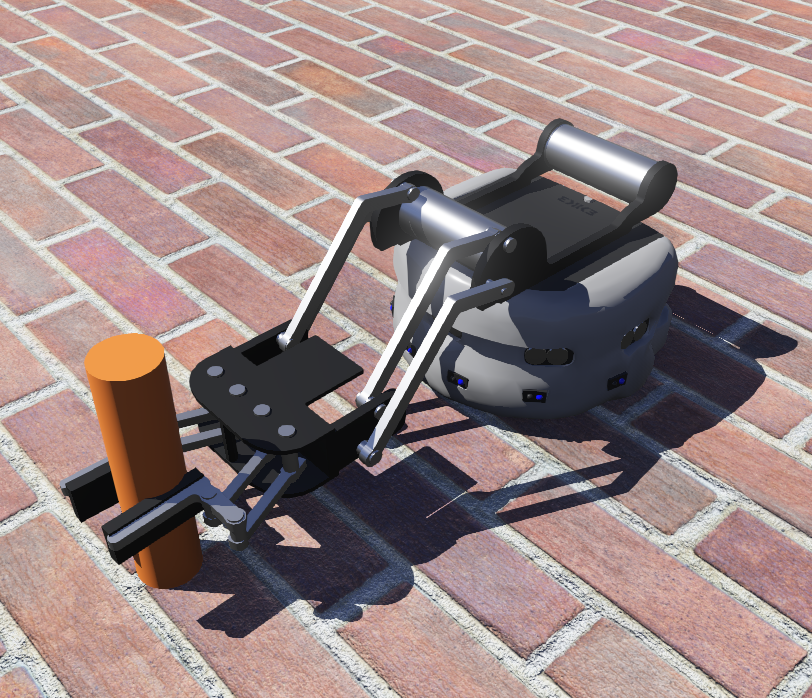
A simulation model of the Khepera III robot with gripper in Webots.

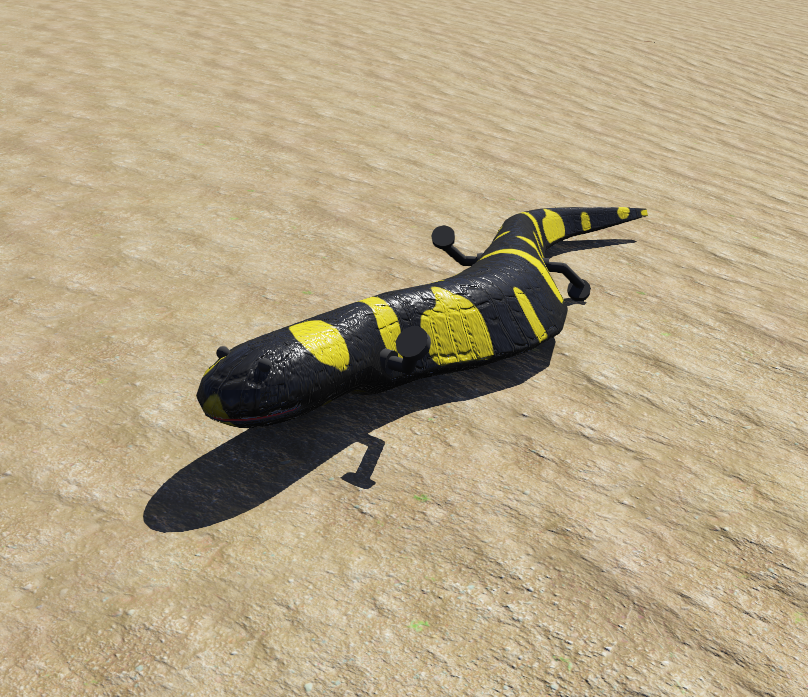
A simulation model of a salamander robot in Webots which has a deformable skin.

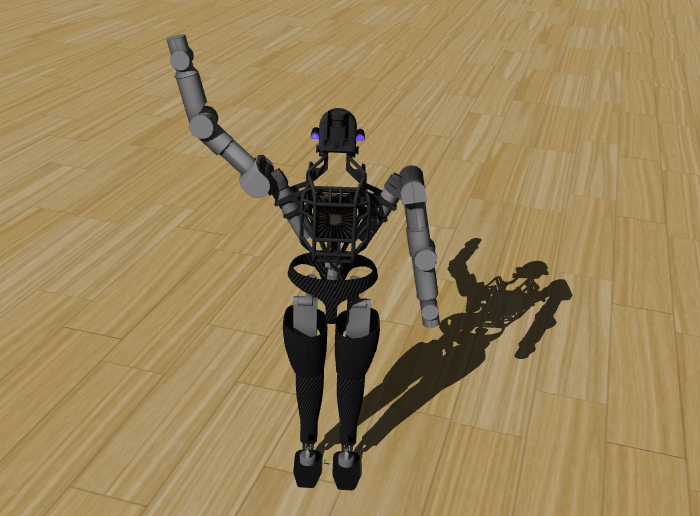
A simulation model of the Boston Dynamics Atlas robot in Webots.

== Web interface ==
Since August 18, 2017, the robotbenchmark.net website has offered free access to a series of robotics benchmarks based on Webots simulations through the Webots web interface. Webots instances are running in the cloud and the 3D views are displayed in the user browser. From this web interface, users can program robots in Python and learn robot control in a step-by-step procedure.

== Controller programming example ==
This is a simple example of C/C++ controller programming with Webots: a trivial collision avoidance behavior. Initially, the robot runs forwards, then when an obstacle is detected it rotates around itself for a while and then resumes the forward motion.

#include <webots/robot.h>
#include <webots/motor.h>
#include <webots/distance_sensor.h>

#define TIME_STEP 64

int main() {
  // initialize Webots
  wb_robot_init();

  // get handle and enable distance sensor
  WbDeviceTag ds = wb_robot_get_device("ds");
  wb_distance_sensor_enable(ds, TIME_STEP);
  
  // get handle and initialize the motors
  WbDeviceTag left_motor = wb_robot_get_device("left_motor");
  WbDeviceTag right_motor = wb_robot_get_device("right_motor");
  wb_motor_set_position(left_motor, INFINITY);
  wb_motor_set_position(right_motor, INFINITY);
  wb_motor_set_velocity(left_motor, 0.0);
  wb_motor_set_velocity(right_motor, 0.0);

  // control loop
  while (1) {
    // read sensors
    double v = wb_distance_sensor_get_value(ds);

    // if obstacle detected
    if (v > 512) {
      // turn around
      wb_motor_set_velocity(left_motor, -600);
      wb_motor_set_velocity(right_motor, 600);
    }
    else {
      // go straight
      wb_motor_set_velocity(left_motor, 600);
      wb_motor_set_velocity(right_motor, 600);
    }
    
    // run a simulation step
    wb_robot_step(TIME_STEP);
  }

  wb_robot_cleanup();
  return 0;
}

== Main fields of application ==
- Fast prototyping of wheeled and legged robots
- Research on robot locomotion
- Swarm intelligence (Multi-robot simulations)
- Artificial life and evolutionary robotics
- Simulation of adaptive behaviour
- Self-Reconfiguring Modular Robotics
- Experimental environment for computer vision
- Teaching and robot programming contests

== Included robot models ==
A complete and up-to-date list is provided in the Webots user guide.

- AIBO ERS7 and ERS210, Sony Corporation
- BIOLOID (dog), Robotis
- Boe-Bot
- DARwIn-OP, Robotis
- E-puck
- Hemisson
- HOAP-2, Fujitsu Limited
- iCub
- iRobot Create, iRobot
- Katana IPR, Neuronics AG
- Khepera mobile robot I, II, III, K-Team Corporation
- KHR-2HV, KHR-3HV, Kondo
- Koala, K-Team Corporation
- Lego Mindstorms (RCX Rover model)
- Magellan
- Nao V2, V3, Aldebaran Robotics
- MobileRobots Inc Pioneer 2, Pioneer 3-DX, Pioneer 3-AT
- Puma 560, Unimate
- Scout 2
- Shrimp III, BlueBotics SA
- Surveyor SRV-1, Surveyor Corporation
- youBot, KUKA

== Cross compilation and remote control support ==
- E-puck
- DARwIn-OP and Robotis OP2
- NAO
- Thymio II

== See also ==
- ROS
- E-puck
- List of robotics software
