= Khepera mobile robot =

Mobile robot by EPFL

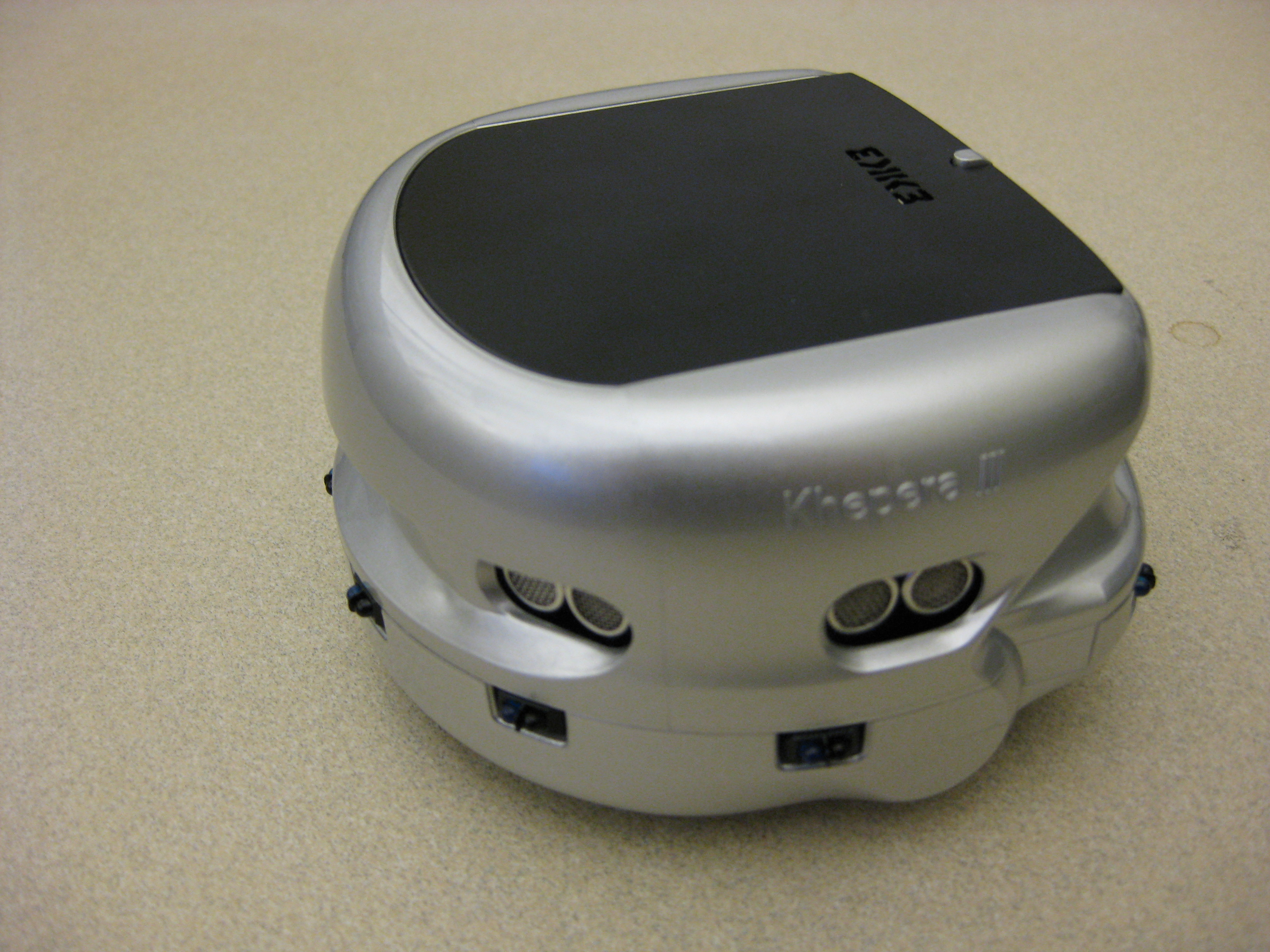
A Khepera III robot at the Georgia Institute of Technology

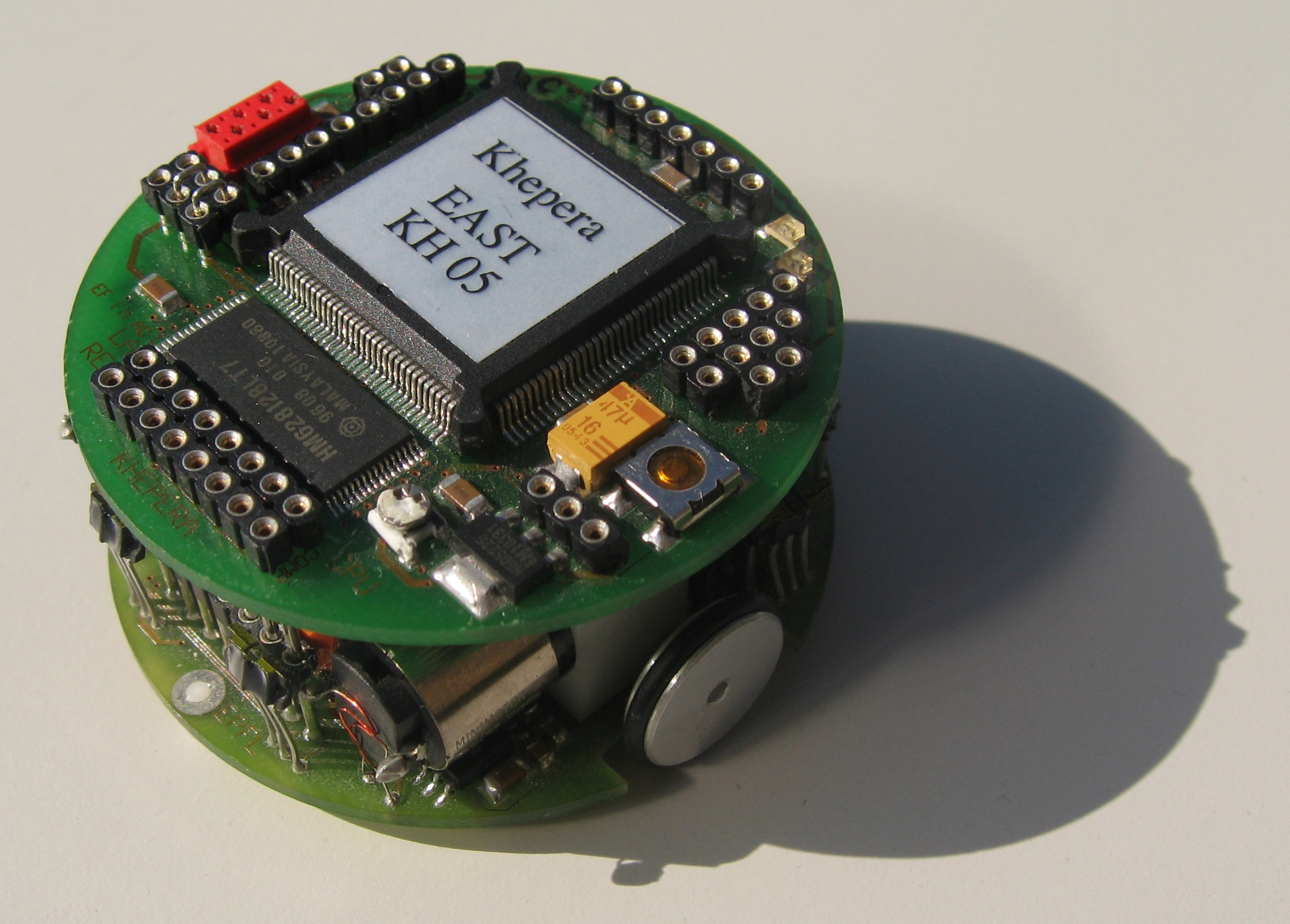
The first generation Khepera robot released in 1996

The Khepera is a small (5.5 cm) differential wheeled mobile robot that was developed at the LAMI laboratory of Professor Jean-Daniel Nicoud at EPFL (Lausanne, Switzerland) in the mid-1990s. It was developed by Edo. Franzi, Francesco Mondada, André Guignard and others.

The system is based on a Motorola 68331 processor and has been used in research applications for over a decade due to its compact design and processing capabilities. It has been cited in more than 8,000 scientific papers.

== Development history ==
The Khepera project began in 1991 at EPFL's Microcomputing Laboratory (LAMI), led by Jean-Daniel Nicoud. Kaspar Suter completed the first working prototype by December 1991, featuring a two-board stack architecture with differential-drive wheels, Teflon ball castors, DC micromotors, and infrared sensors for obstacle detection. Concurrently, Francesco Mondada and Edoardo Franzi required a compact, autonomous robot to test artificial neural network controllers during a Swiss national research program (PNR23). This collaboration resulted in the production of the Khepera I, employing a Motorola 68331 32-bit microcontroller at 16 MHz, 256 KB RAM, and 512 KB ROM for firmware and user code.

In 1995, Mondada, Franzi, and colleagues founded the spin-off company K-Team to commercialize the robot line. By 1999, over 700 Khepera I robots had been distributed globally, necessitating regular production and support by K-Team.

== Technical specifications ==
=== Mechanical design ===
The Khepera I features a circular chassis 55 mm in diameter and 30 mm tall, fabricated from plastic and metal layers. It uses differential-drive locomotion with two DC gearmotor–driven wheels and ball castors for balance. Wheel encoders provide approximately 600 counts per revolution, enabling precise odometry.

=== Sensors ===
Eight infrared transceiver sensors (SFH900 series) are arranged around the perimeter (six frontal and two rear), operating in active mode for proximity sensing (up to 10 cm) and passive mode for ambient light measurement. The platform includes analog inputs for additional sensors and battery monitoring.

=== Processor and electronics ===
The main processor is a Motorola 68331 microcontroller at 16 MHz, with 256 KB RAM and 512 KB ROM for user programs. The robot runs a real-time multitasking firmware, interfacing via RS-232 serial communications for program upload and telemetry. Cross-compilation on a host PC is used to develop and download C-based controller code.

=== Expandability ===
Khepera's modular design allows stacking of extension turrets on top of the main body, connecting via parallel and serial busses. Turrets developed include gripper modules, linear CCD camera turrets, wireless communication packs, prototyping boards, and advanced sensor modules with dedicated microcontrollers.

== Successors and versions ==
=== Khepera II ===
Released in 1998, Khepera II retained the original form factor but upgraded to a 25 MHz Motorola 68331 CPU, 512 KB RAM, 512 KB Flash, and NiMH batteries for up to 1 hour of operation. Backward compatibility ensured continued use of Khepera I turrets and accessories.

=== Khepera III ===
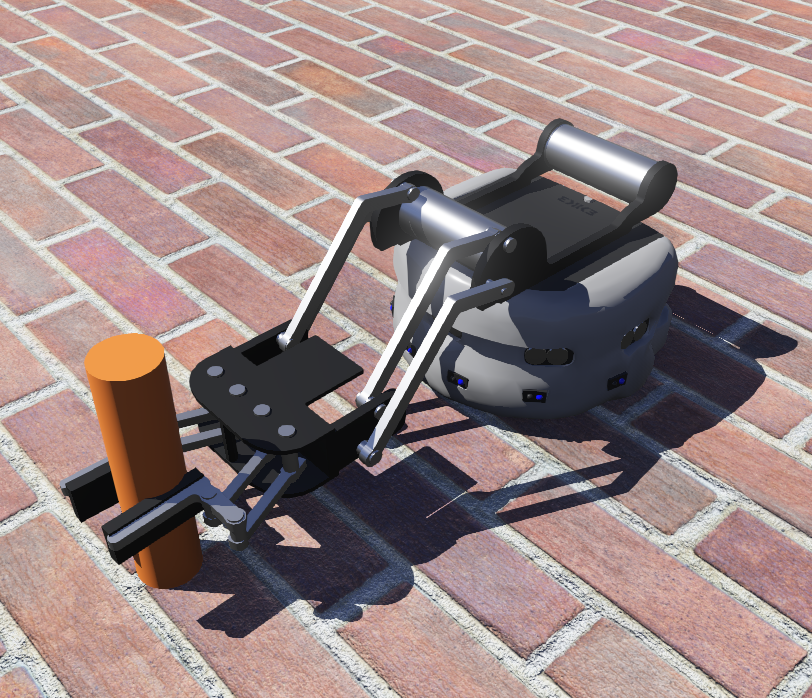
A simulation model of the Khepera III robot with gripper in Webots.

Launched in 2005, Khepera III expanded to a 120 mm diameter chassis to incorporate additional sensors, including nine perimeter IR sensors, two ground-facing IR sensors, and five ultrasonic rangefinders (up to 4 m range). It introduced a modular embedded Linux module (KoreBot) based on an Intel XScale PXA-255 at 400 MHz, providing Wi-Fi and Bluetooth connectivity, hot-swappable Li-ion batteries, and advanced onboard processing for SLAM and swarm robotics research.

=== Khepera IV ===
Released in 2014, Khepera IV features a 140 mm diameter chassis with 12 IR sensors, five ultrasonic sensors, an inertial measurement unit, wheel encoders, an integrated front-facing color camera (752×480), and audio input. It uses a Gumstix Overo COM module (TI OMAP3530 Cortex-A8 at 800 MHz) running embedded Linux, with 512 MB RAM and LiPo batteries for several hours of operation.

== Technical details ==
=== Original version ===
- Diameter: 55 mm
- Height: 30 mm
- Empty weight: 80 g
- Speed: 0.02 to 1.0 m/s
- Autonomy: 45 minutes moving
- Motorola 68331 CPU @ 16 MHz
- 256 KB RAM
- 512 KB EEPROM
- Running μKOS RTOS
- 2 DC brushed servo motors with incremental encoders
- 8 infrared proximity and ambient light sensors (SFH900)

=== 2.0 Version ===
- Motorola 68331 CPU @ 25 MHz
- 512 KB RAM
- 512 KB Flash
- Improved batteries and sensors

=== 3.0 Version ===
- 800 MHz ARM Cortex-A8 Processor
- Weight: 540g
- 256 MB RAM
- 512 MB plus additional 8GB for data
- Battery: 7.4V Lithium Polymer, 3400mAh

== Extensions ==
Several extension turrets exist for the Khepera, including:

- Gripper
- 1D or 2D camera, wire or wireless
- Radio emitter/receiver, low and high speed
- I/0

== Research applications ==
Khepera has been instrumental in founding the field of evolutionary robotics. Floreano and Mondada (1996) evolved neural network controllers for obstacle avoidance and homing behaviors on physical Kheperas. Miglino et al. (1995) demonstrated robust transfer of evolved controllers from simulation to real robots. Floreano and Mondada (1998) further refined evolutionary neurocontrollers for autonomous behavior.

In behavior-based control, Sugihara et al. (2001) applied competitive-cooperative neural architectures for trajectory smoothing. Khepera's modular turrets enabled early vision-based navigation studies using CCD sensors.

Swarm robotics research employed multiple Kheperas in collaborative tasks. Martinoli et al. (2004) rigorously compared swarm control models with physical experiments on stick-pulling tasks. Collective foraging and communication protocols were validated on Khepera teams with wireless modules.

Khepera also served as a testbed for neuromorphic control systems. Verschure et al. (2003) used a cortical model to mediate perception and action in Khepera, publishing results in *Nature*.

== Educational use ==
Since the 1990s, Khepera has been adopted in university courses on robotics, embedded systems, control theory, and AI, offering hands-on experience in sensor integration, controller development, and real-time programming. It has featured in undergraduate lab assignments (e.g., maze solving, line following) and advanced projects (e.g., robot soccer, multi-robot coordination). Khepera's compatibility with simulation tools like Webots allows seamless transfer of code from virtual to real robots.

== Commercialization ==
Khepera's commercialization by K-Team established one of the first standardized research robots, enhancing experimental reproducibility across labs. The platform's success spurred the development of related robots such as the Koala and e-puck series, and the Webots simulator originated as a Khepera simulator. Its influence extends to modern swarm and mini-robot research, demonstrating that significant robotics research can be conducted on small-scale autonomous platforms.

== See also ==
- Koala robot- a following model developed by the same company
- E-puck - a following model developed by part of the original team who developed Khepera
- Webots – software that simulates and allows cross-compilation and remote control of the Khepera and other robots
- K-Team - The company selling Khepera
