= André Guignard =

Swiss engineer

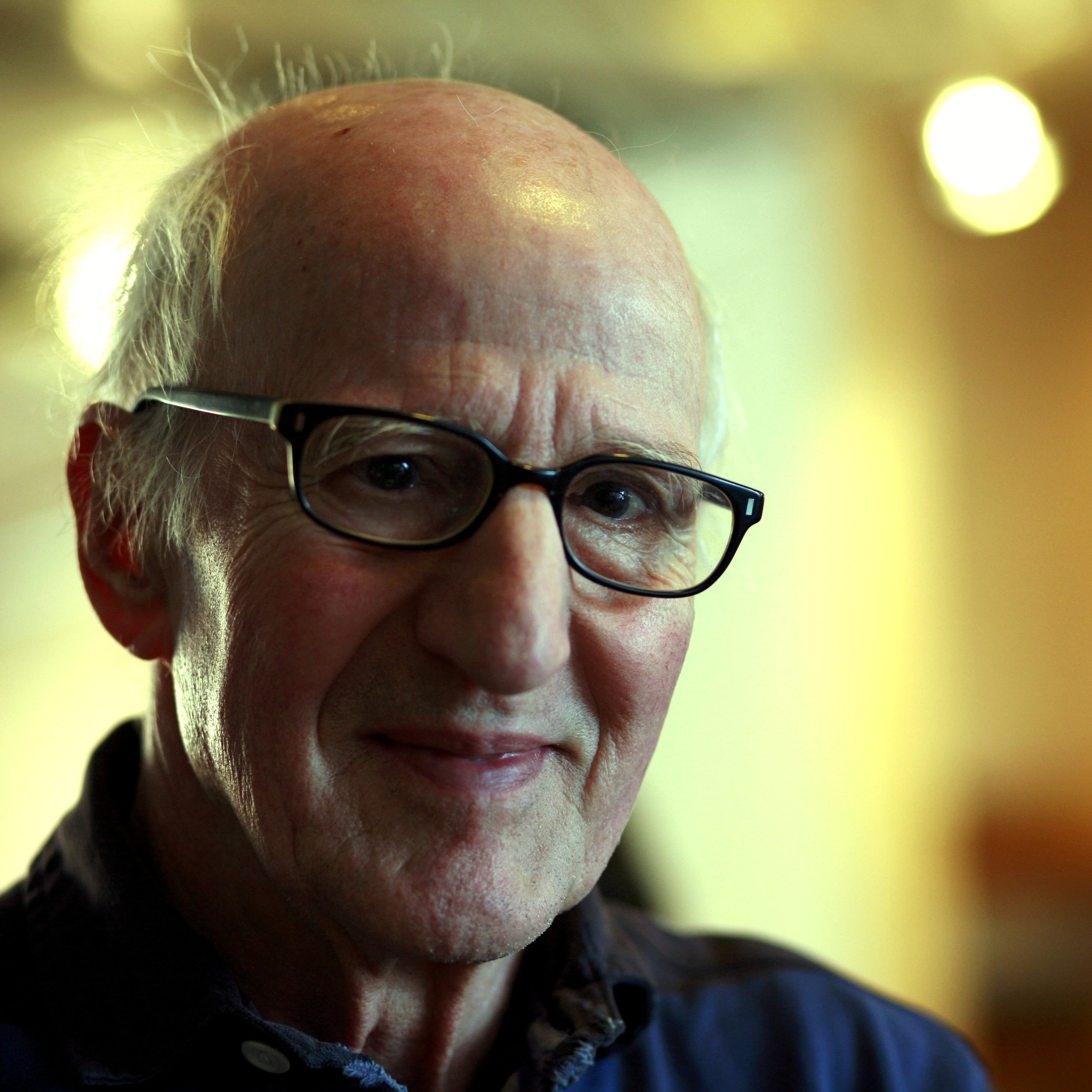
Guignard

André Guignard is a Swiss engineer initially educated as a watchmaker. He is the creator of the mechanic of the Khepera, the S-bot and several other mobile robots.

Working at the LAMI of the EPFL with Professor Jean-Daniel Nicoud, he designed and realised in 1977 the first modern computer mouse, that started the successful Logitech diversification.

Born in 1942, he was enrolled at the EPFL in 1976 and made many research projects successful due to an exceptional mastering of how to conceive and build micromechanical systems. His interaction with students was always greatly appreciated. He retired in March 2007, but still helps part time with EPFL research projects.

== The Swiss Mouse ==
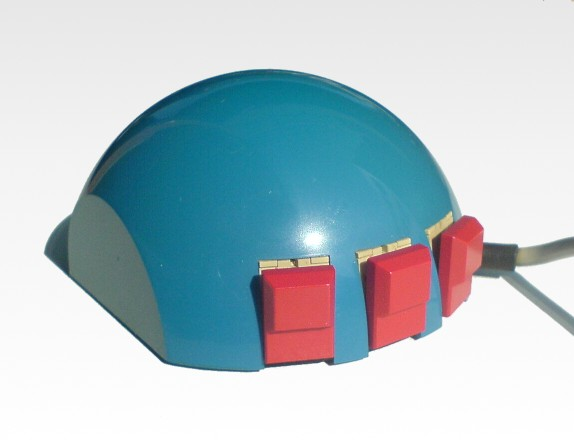
The Guignard mouse, manufactured in 1980-83 by Dépraz and sold by Logitech as their first mouse

Prototypes of an improved Engelbart mouse with an optical encoder were built at LAMI-EPFL in 1972, see EPFL mouse story but there was no need for a mouse when graphic screens were not available. The LAMI-EPFL developed several microprocessor driven graphic screens since 1974 and André Guignard designed in 1977 a reliable mechanism for measuring the ball movement with optical encoders. This was the first modern computer mouse using an optical encoder.

== Robots ==
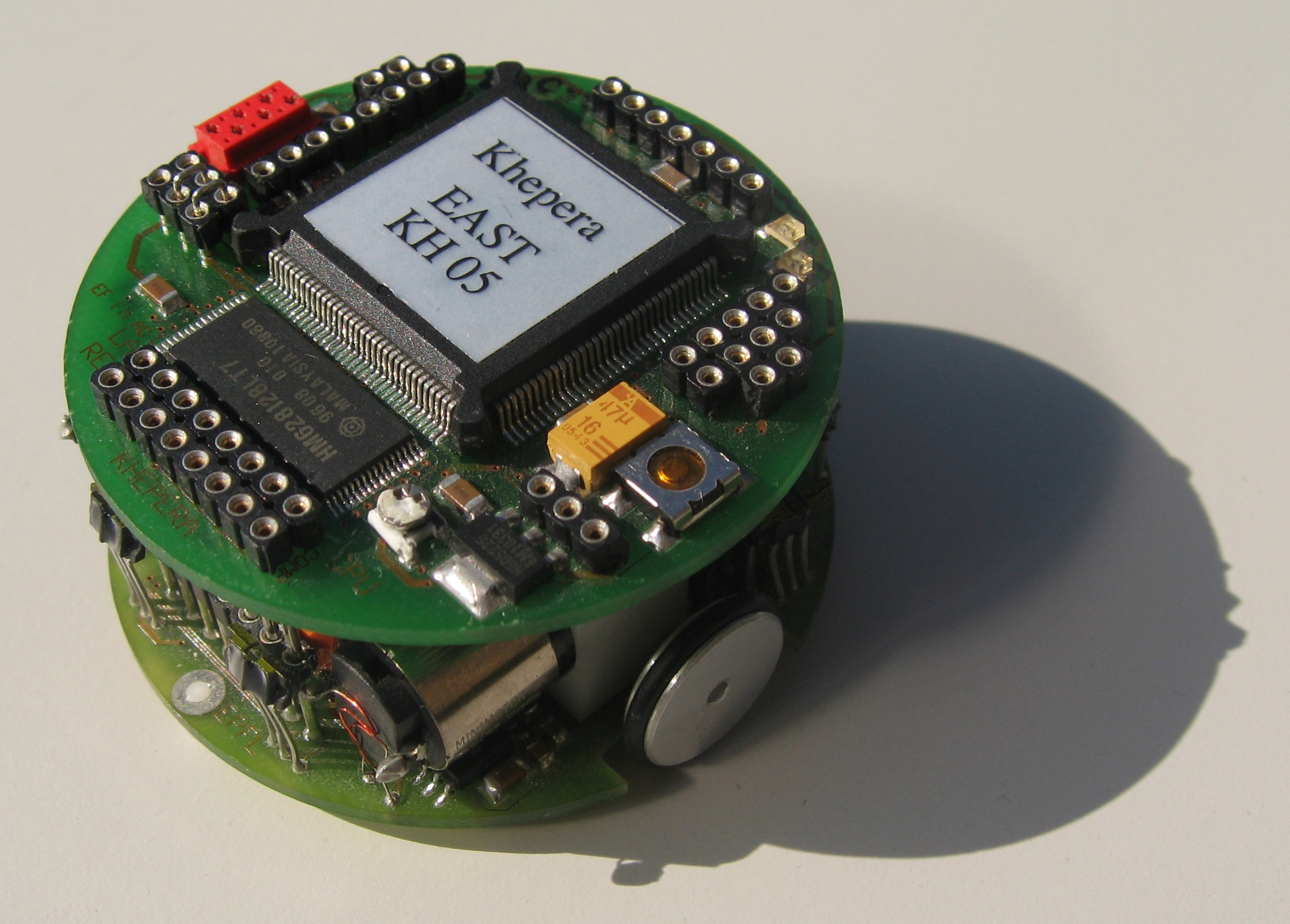
The 1996 Khepera

=== The Khepera ===
A student project for a 5 cm diameter robot was redesigned in 1993 by André Guignard, Francesco Mondada and Edo. Franzi. After the first prototypes, the construction of this powerful small robot named Khepera from the scarab-looking Egyptian god Khepra was subcontracted to Forelec until K-Team SA foundation in 1996. The Khepera was sold to a thousand of research labs and hold the cover of Nature in its issue of August 31st, 2000, linked with the article of Michael J. B. Krieger, Jean-Bernard Billeter and Laurent Keller.

André Guignard and Robota

=== The Robota Doll ===
The Robota research objective of Prof Aude Billard is to engage in complex interaction with humans. In 1999, Prof Aude Billard was in need of a doll with moving legs and head. André Guignard built the mechanics, and added in 2005 moving eyes with a camera inside in the 8 cm diameter head. He helped students to build multi-degrees of liberty arms and necks.

=== The S-bot (European project) ===
The swarm-bots project was in need of a number of simpler, insect-like, robots (s-bots), built out of relatively cheap components, capable of self-assembling and self-organising to adapt to their environment. André Guignard interacted with Francesco Mondada and the other partners of the project and built 35 mechanically complex 15 cm in diameter s-bot robots that can grip each other to pass over an obstacle. The s-bot was ranked on position 39 in the list of “The 50 Best Robots Ever” (fiction or real) by the Wired magazine in 2006.

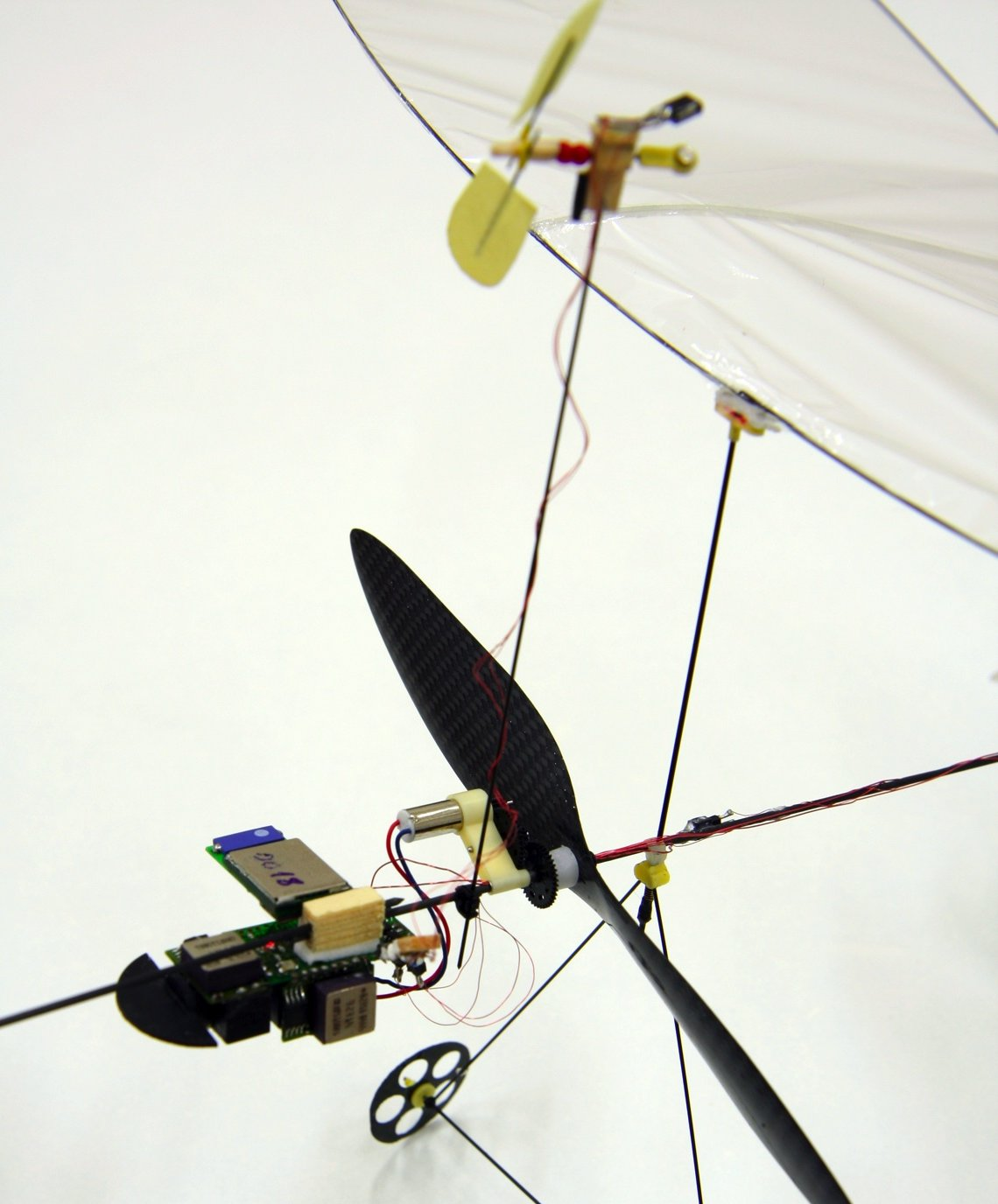
10-grams flying robot

=== Flying robot ===
Jean-Christophe Zufferey PhD thesis was on bio-inspired autonomous flying. The 2006 smaller plane of the microflyer project flies in a 7x7m space. Based on the 5g microCeline of Didel, the 5 grams payload includes two linear cameras compacted by André Guignard and a tricky propeller gearbox in the middle of the fuselage, so the camera is in front. The propeller on top is a 0.2g anemometer measuring wind speed down to 0.1 m/s.

Amphibious salamander robot

=== Snake and salamander robots ===
Prof. Auke Ijspeert is concerned about the neural mechanisms of movement control in vertebrates. André Guignard developed and built for him all the mechanics of the AmphiBot snake robots, as well as those of the Salamandra robotica salamander robot. One of the major difficulties building these amphibious robots was indeed their waterproofing.

=== Robots made by students with the help of André Guignard ===
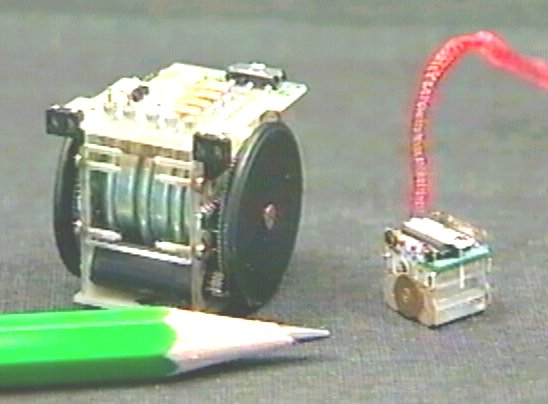
Robots for the Nagoya contest

Another 1 cc robot with piezo motors

Bidirectional robot for a maze contest

Robot searching for antipersonel mines
