= S-bot mobile robot =

S-bot
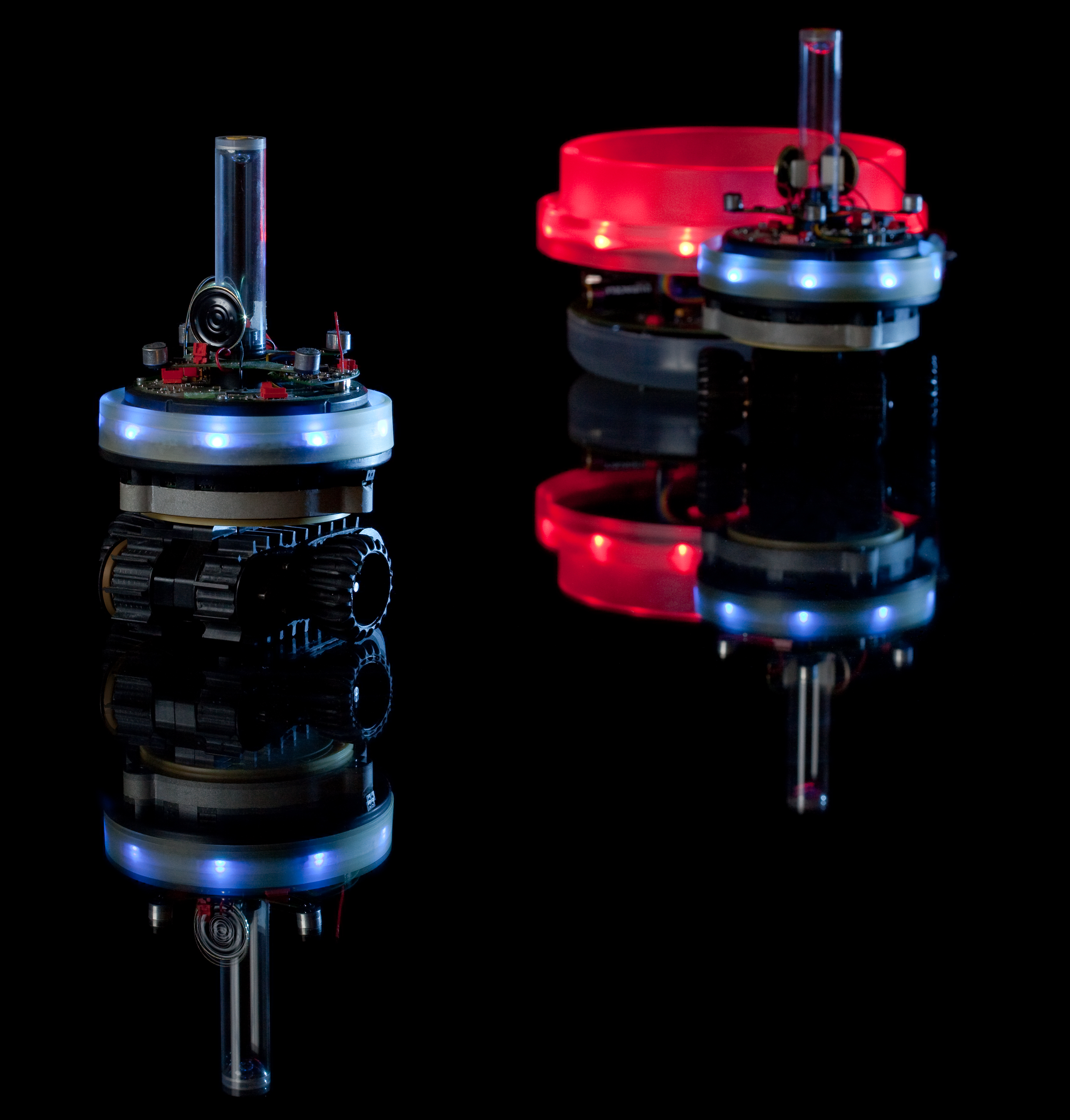
- S-bot mobile robot.
- Developer: LIS (Laboratory of Intelligent Systems)
- Type: robot
- Lifespan: between 2001 and 2004

The s-bot is a small (15 cm) differential wheeled (with additional tracks) mobile robot developed at the LIS (Laboratory of Intelligent Systems) at the EPFL in Lausanne, Switzerland between 2001 and 2004. Targeted to swarm robotics, a field of artificial intelligence, it was developed within the Swarm-bots project, a Future and Emerging Technologies project coordinated by Prof. Marco Dorigo. Built by a small team of engineers (Francesco Mondada, André Guignard, Michael Bonani and Stéphane Magnenat) of the group of Prof. Dario Floreano and with the help of student projects, it is considered at the time of completion as one of the most complex and featured robots ever for its size. The s-bot was ranked on position 39 in the list of “The 50 Best Robots Ever” (fiction or real) by the Wired magazine in 2006.

== Purpose and use of the s-bot ==
This is a research robot, aimed at studying teamwork and inter-robot communication. To do this, the s-bots have several special abilities:

- Using their gripper (red in the photos), they can connect. Then they can, for instance, pass over gap and steps where a single robot would have failed.
- Using their integrated force sensor, they can coordinate to retrieve an object to a certain location without the use of explicit communication. This is the way ants bring preys to the nest.

Of course, all other sensors and actuators, also found on other robots, can be used to do teamwork such as food foraging.

== Technical details ==
=== General ===
- 12 cm diameter
- 15 cm height
- 660 g
- 2 LiIon batteries
- 1 hour autonomy moving

=== Control ===
- 400 MHz custom XScale CPU board, 64 MB of RAM, 32 MB of flash memory
- 12 distributed PIC microcontroller for low-level handling
- Custom Linux port running Familiar
- Wi-Fi

Image of the s-bot mobile robot climbing a step in the swarm-bot configuration.

=== Actuators ===
- 2 treels
- turret rotation
- rigid gripper elevation
- rigid gripper
- 3 axis side arm
- side arm gripper

=== Sensors ===
- 15 infrared sensors around the turret
- 4 infrared sensors below the robot
- position sensors on all degrees of freedom except gripper
- force and speed sensors on all major degrees of freedom
- 2 humidity sensors
- 2 temperature sensors
- 8 ambient light sensors around the turret
- 4 accelerometers, which allow three-dimensional orientation
- 1 640×480 camera sensor. Custom optic based on spherical mirror provides omnidirectional vision
- 4 microphones
- 2 axis structure deformation sensors
- optical barrier in grippers

S-bot by night showing color ring.

=== LEDS ===
- 8 × RGB Light-emitting diodes around the turret
- red Light-emitting diodes in grippers

Several s-bots in swarm-bot configuration passing over a gap.

== Special abilities ==
S-bots can connect to other s-bots to create a bigger structure known as the swarm-bot. To do so, they attach together using their rigid gripper and ring. An s-bot has sufficient force to lift another one.

== Integrated software ==
The s-bot features a custom Linux port running the Familiar Linux distribution. All sensors and actuators are easily accessible through a simple C API.
