= Sabine Hauert =

Roboticist

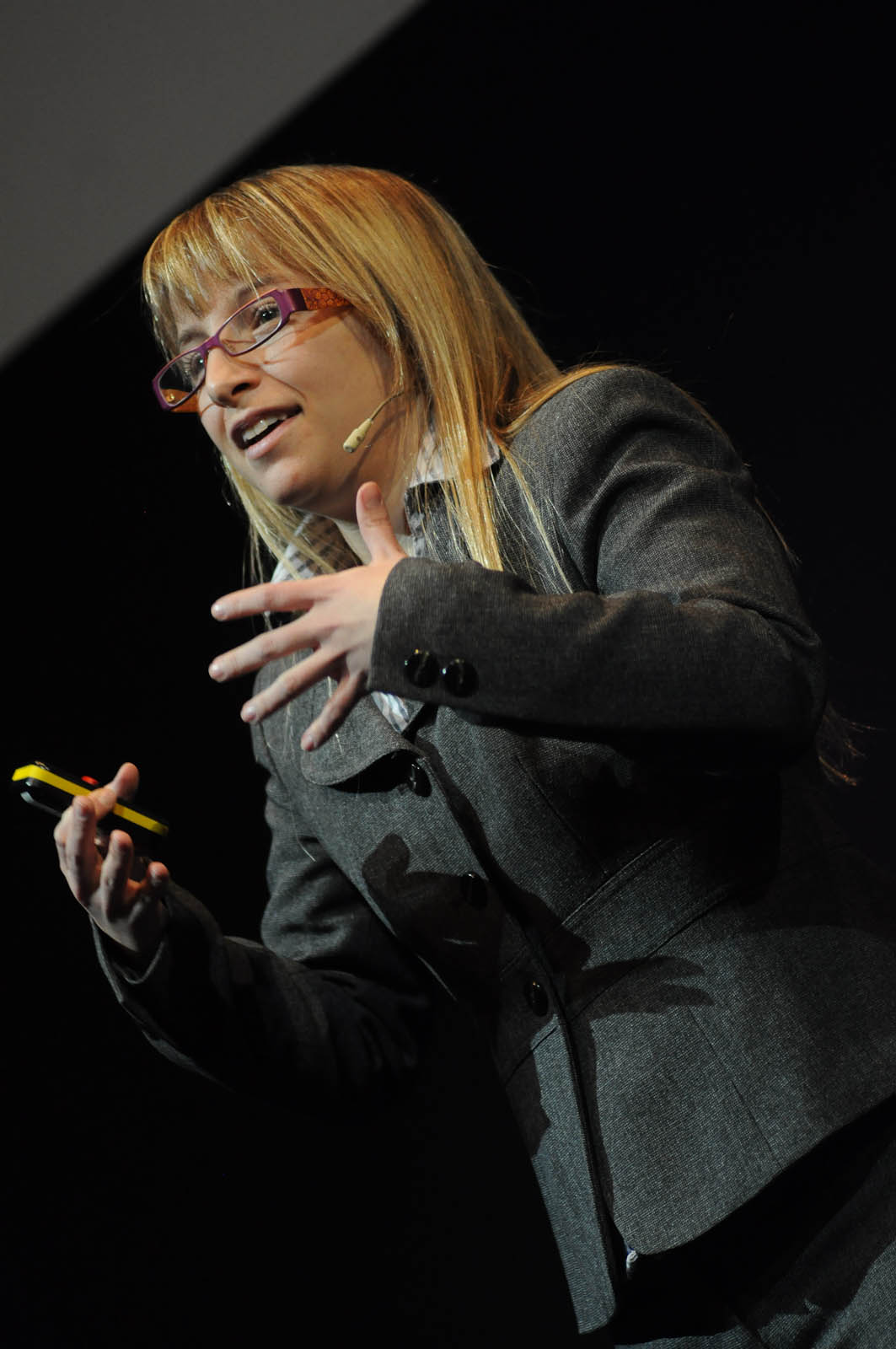
- Born: 16 July 1983 (age 43)
- Education: École Polytechnique Fédérale de Lausanne (BSc, MSc, PhD); Carnegie Mellon University
- Awards: RoboCup (2005)
- Scientific career
- Fields: Cancer; Robotics; Nanomedicine; Swarm intelligence
- Workplaces: University of Bristol; Massachusetts Institute of Technology
- Thesis: Evolutionary Synthesis of Communication-Based Aerial Swarms (2010)
- Doctoral advisor: Dario Floreano; Jean-Christophe Zufferey
- Website: hauertlab.com

Sabine Hauert (born 16 July 1983) is Professor of Swarm Engineering in the Bristol Robotics Laboratory at the University of Bristol where her research investigates swarm robotics. Previously she worked at the Massachusetts Institute of Technology (MIT), Carnegie Mellon University (CMU) and the École Polytechnique Fédérale de Lausanne (EPFL) in Switzerland.

== Education ==
Hauert was educated at the École Polytechnique Fédérale de Lausanne (EPFL) where she was awarded Bachelor of Science, Master of Science and Doctor of Philosophy degrees. During her study she participated in a student exchange program at Carnegie Mellon University (CMU). Her PhD on aerial swarm robotics was supervised by Dario Floreano and Jean-Christophe Zufferey and awarded in 2010.

== Career and research ==
Hauert's research investigates swarm intelligence, robotics, nanomedicine and cancer. Her work has appeared in Nature, Science, the European Parliament, the Royal Society and featured in mainstream media including the BBC, CNN, The Guardian, The Economist, TEDx, Wired, and New Scientist. Hauert is president and co-founder of robohub.org, a nonprofit organization and online communication platform that brings together experts in robotics research, start-ups, business and education from across the globe.

Hauert served as a member of the working group on machine learning at the Royal Society from 2015 to 2017.

=== Awards and honours ===
Hauert was a member of the team that won first place at the RoboCup US Open in 2005. She was a selectee at the 63rd Lindau Nobel Laureate Meeting in 2013 and was awarded a postdoctoral fellowship at MIT by the Human Frontier Science Program (HFSP) in 2011.
