= E-puck mobile robot =

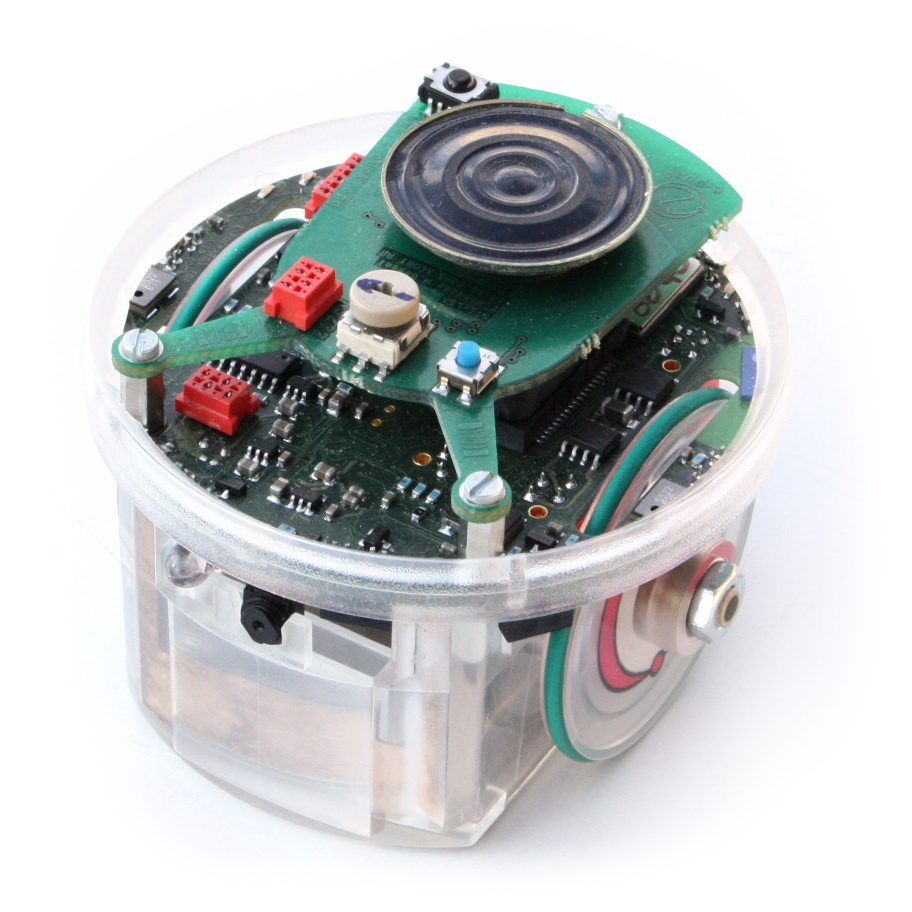
e-puck mobile robot

The e-puck is a small (7 cm) differential wheeled mobile robot. It was originally designed for micro-engineering education by Michael Bonani and Francesco Mondada at the ASL laboratory of Prof. Roland Siegwart at EPFL (Lausanne, Switzerland). The e-puck is open hardware and its onboard software is open-source, and is built and sold by several companies.

== Technical details ==
- Diameter: 70 mm
- Height: 50 mm
- Weight: 200 g
- Max speed: 13 cm/s
- Autonomy: 2 hours moving
- dsPIC 30 CPU @ 30 MHz (15 MIPS)
- 8 KB RAM
- 144 KB Flash
- 2 step motors
- 8 infrared proximity and light (TCRT1000)
- color camera, 640x480
- 8 LEDs in ring + one body LED + one front LED
- 3D accelerometers
- 3 microphones
- 1 loudspeaker

== Extensions ==
New modules can be stacked on top of the e-puck; the following extensions are available:

- a turret that simulates 1D omnidirectional vision, to study optic flow,
- ground sensors, for instance to follow a line,
- color LED turret, for color-based communication,
- Zigbee communication,
- 2D omnidirectional vision,
- magnetic wheels, for vertical climbing,
- Pi-puck extension board, for interfacing with a Raspberry Pi single-board computer.

== Scientific use ==
Since the e-puck is open hardware, its price is lower than competitors. This is leading to a rapid adoption by the scientific community in research despite the original educational orientation of the robot. The e-puck has been used in collective robotics , evolutionary robotics , and art-oriented robotics .
