= Francesco Mondada =

Swiss academic in artificial intelligence and robotics

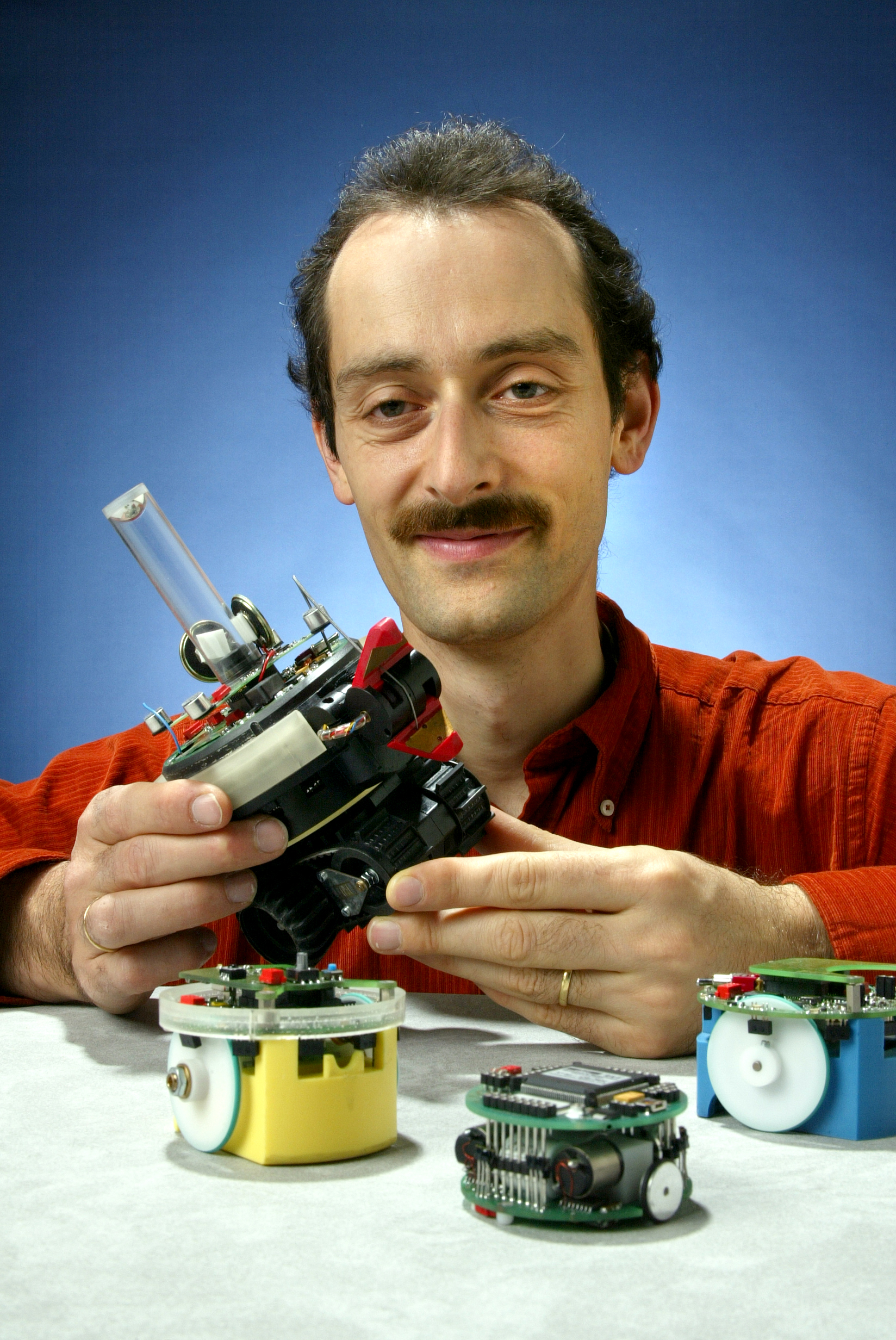
- Born: Locarno, Switzerland
- Citizenship: Switzerland
- Education: Ecole Polytechnique Fédérale de Lausanne
- Known for: Khepera mobile robot, E-puck mobile robot, Thymio
- Awards: Latsis Foundation University Prize, Credit Suisse Best Teaching Award, Gold Polytechnik-Preis
- Scientific career
- Fields: Robotics, computer science
- Workplaces: Ecole Polytechnique Fédérale de Lausanne

Francesco Mondada (born 17 March 1967) is a Swiss roboticist, engineer, and academic known for his work and research in mobile robotics, swarm robotics, and educational robotics. He is affiliated with École Polytechnique Fédérale de Lausanne, where he leads the MOBOTS research group. Mondada is known for developing robotic platforms, including the Khepera robot, e-puck robot, s-bot, marXbot, and Thymio, which have been widely adopted in robotics research and education.

== Biography ==
Mondada was born in Locarno. He studied microengineering at EPFL, receiving a Master of Science degree in 1991 and a doctorate in 1997. During his doctoral research, he contributed to the development of miniature autonomous mobile robots, establishing the technical foundations for later work in collective and bio-inspired robotics.

== Career ==
While completing his doctoral studies in the early 1990s, Mondada co-developed the Khepera mobile robot and co-founded K-Team SA in 1995. He was chief executive officer and president of the company until 2000, overseeing the commercialization of mobile robotic systems for academic and industrial use. Following this period, he returned to EPFL as a senior scientist and briefly held a research position at the California Institute of Technology.

Between 2001 and 2007, Mondada held postdoctoral and senior scientific appointments at EPFL, working with laboratories led by prominent roboticists including Dario Floreano, Roland Siegwart, and Hannes Bleuler. During this period he contributed to major European collaborative robotics projects, including Swarm-bots and Swarmanoid. In 2010, he assumed leadership of EPFL’s educational robotics research within the Swiss National Centre of Competence in Research Robotics.

In 2013, EPFL appointed Mondada Adjunct Professor of Robotics. He subsequently became head of the MOBOTS laboratory and later directed the Center for Learning Sciences at EPFL. His academic work has combined robotics engineering with educational innovation, promoting open-source robotics for formal education and interdisciplinary experimentation.

== Research and robotic works ==
Mondada’s research has focused on the design of compact autonomous robots for collective intelligence, adaptive systems, and educational applications. His earliest major contribution, the Khepera robot, became one of the widely used platforms in bio-inspired robotics and experimental control systems, appearing in thousands of scientific publications. Its modular architecture established a standard platform for evolutionary robotics research.

As principal designer of the s-bot platform for the European Swarm-bots project, Mondada developed one of the first physically self-organizing robotic systems capable of autonomous collective behavior. The project became a landmark in swarm robotics and was recognized by the European Commission as a major technological success. The robot was later listed by Wired among the “50 Best Robots Ever”.

Mondada subsequently led development of the e-puck robot, an open-hardware educational platform widely used in university robotics curricula, and later the marXbot system for modular swarm experimentation. In 2010, he co-created Thymio, an open-source educational robot designed for primary and secondary education. The development of the Thymio robot earned Francesco Mondada in 2022 the Gold Polytechnik-Preis from the Stiftung Polytechnische Gesellschaft.

His later research expanded into biohybrid systems and robot-animal interaction, including robotic platforms used to study collective fish behavior and social interaction mechanisms. Across these projects, Mondada’s work has emphasized mechatronic precision, open-source accessibility, and the integration of robotics into both scientific research and formal education systems.

== Selected publications ==
- Mondada, Francesco; Franzi, Edoardo; Ienne, Paolo (1994). "Mobile robot miniaturisation: A tool for investigation in control algorithms". In Yoshikawa, Tsuneo; Miyazaki, Fumio (eds.). Experimental Robotics III. Lecture Notes in Control and Information Sciences. Vol. 200. Berlin, Heidelberg: Springer. pp. 501–513. doi:10.1007/BFb0027617. ISBN 978-3-540-39355-9.
- Floreano, D.; Mondada, F. (1996). "Evolution of homing navigation in a real mobile robot". IEEE Transactions on Systems, Man, and Cybernetics, Part B (Cybernetics). 26 (3): 396–407. Bibcode:1996ITSMB..26..396F. doi:10.1109/3477.499791. ISSN 1941-0492. PMID 18263042.
- Halloy, J.; Sempo, G.; Caprari, G.; Rivault, C.; Asadpour, M.; Tâche, F.; Saïd, I.; Durier, V.; Canonge, S.; Amé, J. M.; Detrain, C.; Correll, N.; Martinoli, A.; Mondada, F.; Siegwart, R. (2007-11-16). "Social Integration of Robots into Groups of Cockroaches to Control Self-Organized Choices". Science. 318 (5853): 1155–1158. Bibcode:2007Sci...318.1155H. doi:10.1126/science.1144259. PMID 18006751.
- Mondada, Francesco; Pettinaro, Giovanni C.; Guignard, Andre; Kwee, Ivo W.; Floreano, Dario; Deneubourg, Jean-Louis; Nolfi, Stefano; Gambardella, Luca Maria; Dorigo, Marco (2004-09-01). "Swarm-Bot: A New Distributed Robotic Concept". Autonomous Robots. 17 (2): 193–221. doi:10.1023/B:AURO.0000033972.50769.1c. ISSN 1573-7527.
- Dorigo, Marco; Trianni, Vito; Şahin, Erol; Groß, Roderich; Labella, Thomas H.; Baldassarre, Gianluca; Nolfi, Stefano; Deneubourg, Jean-Louis; Mondada, Francesco; Floreano, Dario; Gambardella, Luca M. (2004-09-01). "Evolving Self-Organizing Behaviors for a Swarm-Bot". Autonomous Robots. 17 (2): 223–245. doi:10.1023/B:AURO.0000033973.24945.f3. hdl:11511/47139. ISSN 1573-7527.
- Floreano, D.; Mondada, F. (1998-10-01). "Evolutionary neurocontrollers for autonomous mobile robots". Neural Networks. 11 (7–8): 1461–1478. doi:10.1016/S0893-6080(98)00082-3. ISSN 0893-6080. PMID 12662762.
