= Evolutionary robotics =

Embodied approach to artificial intelligence

Evolutionary robotics is an embodied approach to Artificial Intelligence (AI) in which robots are automatically designed using Darwinian principles of natural selection. The design of a robot, or a subsystem of a robot such as a neural controller, is optimized against a behavioral goal (e.g. run as fast as possible). Usually, designs are evaluated in simulations as fabricating thousands or millions of designs and testing them in the real world is prohibitively expensive in terms of time, money, and safety.

An evolutionary robotics experiment starts with a population of randomly generated robot designs. The worst performing designs are discarded and replaced with mutations and/or combinations of the better designs. This evolutionary algorithm continues until a prespecified amount of time elapses or some target performance metric is surpassed.

Evolutionary robotics methods are particularly useful for engineering machines that must operate in environments in which humans have limited intuition (nanoscale, space, etc.). Evolved simulated robots can also be used as scientific tools to generate new hypotheses in biology and cognitive science, and to test old hypotheses that require experiments that have proven difficult or impossible to carry out in reality.

== History ==
In the early 1990s, two separate European groups demonstrated different approaches to the evolution of robot control systems. Dario Floreano and Francesco Mondada at EPFL evolved controllers for the Khepera robot. Adrian Thompson, Nick Jakobi, Dave Cliff, Inman Harvey, and Phil Husbands evolved controllers for a Gantry robot at the University of Sussex. However the body of these robots was presupposed before evolution.

The first simulations of evolved robots were reported by Karl Sims and Jeffrey Ventrella of the MIT Media Lab, also in the early 1990s. However these so-called virtual creatures never left their simulated worlds. The first evolved robots to be built in reality were 3D-printed by Hod Lipson and Jordan Pollack at Brandeis University at the turn of the 21st century.

== See also ==
- Bio-inspired robotics
- Evolutionary computation
