= Dario Floreano =

Swiss-Italian roboticist and engineer

- Born: 1964 (age 61–62); San Daniele del Friuli, Italy
- Education: University of Trieste; University of Stirling
- Known for: Evolutionary robotics Bio-inspired drones
- Scientific career
- Workplaces: EPFL (École Polytechnique Fédérale de Lausanne)
- Doctoral students: Sabine Hauert
- Website: www.epfl.ch/labs/lis/

Dario Floreano (born 1964 in San Daniele del Friuli, Italy) is a Swiss-Italian roboticist and engineer. He is Director of the Laboratory of Intelligent System (LIS) at the École Polytechnique Fédérale de Lausanne in Switzerland and was the founding director of the Swiss National Centre of Competence in Research (NCCR) Robotics.

== Education and career ==
Floreano received a bachelor's degree from the University of Trieste with a major in visual psychophysics in 1988. In 1989, he joined the Italian National Research Council in Rome as research fellow. He received a master's degree in computer sciences with a specialisation in neural computation from the University of Stirling in 1992. In 1995, he earned a PhD in artificial intelligence and robotics from the University of Trieste. Following a position as Chief Scientific Officer at Cognitive Technology Laboratory Ltd, he joined the EPFL in 1996 as group leader in the Department of Computer Science. In 2000, Floreano was first named Assistant Professor, then in 2005 Associate Professor and in 2010 Full Professor of Intelligent Systems at EPFL's School of Engineering. He was the founding director of the Swiss National Center of Competence in Robotics, which ran for 12 years, between 2010 and 2022. Floreano was named "AI influencer in Switzerland" in 2021. Since 2022, Floreano is a Fellow of the European Center for Living Technologies (ECLT) and since 2023 a Fellow of the Institute of Electrical and Electronics Engineers (IEEE). He also currently serves as an Advisor Board Member for the ELLIS Tübingen Institute for Machine Learning and the Max Planck Institute for Intelligent Systems.

== Research ==
Floreano is interested in design principles of biologically inspired intelligent systems with emphasis on the interplay between artificial intelligence, embodiment, and the environment. Over the past 20 years, he has put significant effort into understanding and designing small aerial machines with biologically-inspired perception, morphology, and behaviour that can be operated in novel ways by, and around, humans.

One of the key research avenues explored in Floreano laboratory is the field of drone perception and design, with several contributions to the design and autonomous control of aerial swarms. In earlier work, Floreano demonstrated the world's first team of 10 fixed-wing drones capable of coordinated outdoor flight by means of novel control algorithms that relied only on local radio communication among neighbouring drones: an algorithm based on ant-colony exploration and an algorithm based on evolutionary algorithms. He then used the 10 fixed-wing drones to study Reynold's flocking algorithms and showed that the vehicle agility and communication range among the drones significantly affected swarm cohesion. Dario Floreano also proposed novel mechanical design and control methods for exploration of buildings by drone swarms: these drones were designed to perch on ceilings for energy saving, and detecting and communicating with other drones. These algorithms and drones, a.k.a. eyebots, were successfully demonstrated in synergetic operation with a swarm of terrestrial robots (footbots) and manipulating robots (handbots) in a mission aimed at finding and retrieving a book placed on a shelf in a room. Floreano and his team later also studied sound-based swarming and have shown that a quadcopter equipped with a microphone array could detect the range and bearing of another emitting high-frequency chirps. In most recent work, Floreano developed a method for vision-based aerial swarms, whereby drones use onboard cameras to detect each other and autonomously coordinate their own motion with swarm algorithms, showing that drones can safely navigate in an outdoor environment despite substantial background clutter and difficult lighting conditions. At the same time, Floreano's team was able to demonstrate autonomous swarming through cluttered environments with model predictive control, where their approach improved the speed, order and safety of the swarm, independently of the environment layout, whilst being scalable in swarm speed and inter-agent distance.

In parallel to the design and autonomous control of aerial swarms, Dario Floreano has been studying body-machine interfaces for more intuitive and immersive tele-robotic operation of drones. His team developed a novel BoMI method to automatically map spontaneous human gestures aimed at interacting with robotic devices. Floreano also developed a soft exoskeleton, called a FlyJacket, coupled with virtual reality goggles and smart gloves to allow non-expert persons to naturally control a drone in search and rescue missions. Floreano's FlyJacket solution was tested by nearly 500 persons at public demonstrations in Lausanne, Zurich, London and Boston. More recently, Floreano and his team showed that haptic feedback is effective at improving BoMI with a drone. His team also developed fabric-based wearable clutches to train humans in more challenging drone teleoperation tasks. This method used haptic feedback to restrain elbow motion and make users aware of their errors, allowing them to consciously learn to prevent errors from occurring. Furthermore, Floreano is interested in studying the effectiveness of different viewpoints in robotic teleoperation with Virtual Reality displays and has developed a machine learning method for extracting the BoMI for drone operation, which showed preliminary results on learning to use hand gestures for steering a swarm in third-person view.

Current work at the LIS also investigates avian-inspired drones, which can morph both their wing and tail surfaces by folding feathers and changing sweep angles in order to improve flight capabilities. Studies have indicated that wing and tail morphing strategy and their synergy enhance the flight agility, maneuverability, stability, and energy efficiency. Other avian-inspired systems being developed by Dario Floreano and his team include mechanisms for perching and terrestrial locomotion.

Another line of research in the Floreano lab has focussed on soft and self-organizing robots. Floreano has studied the design and manufacture of multi-cellular soft robots and developed new functional materials for these applications. His team also studies various aspects of tensegrity robotic systems, which includes modular design, development of manufacturing techniques, and investigation of functional materials. Amongst other examples, Floreano and his team work on new designs for a soft tensegrity robots, which could roll and jump, promising potential applications in disaster mitigation or space exploration. Other designs have included a biomimetic tensegrity fish-like robot, with potential in underwater exploration, inspection and rescue. Most recently, Floreano has been interested in the variable stiffness capabilities of tensegrity systems, which would incorporate novel technologies based on smart materials and elaborate manufacturing techniques. For example, he developed variable stiffness cables based on low melting point alloy (LMPA) smart materials, which could be toggled between rigid and soft states of tensegrity modules. His team also proposed a design for dual stiffness ball joint connections that can switch between a rigid and compliant connection, which were used to design a tensegrity-based spine structure. Another recent example involves dual stiffness rod elements, which can be integrated in the design of robotic joints for rovers and drones to increase their impact and collision resilience. In a related line of research, Floreano looks at the coevolution of the morphology of tensegrity robots, where he studies the influence of the form and stiffness of tensegrity modules on the evolution of the body and the brain of tensegrity robots. Floreano and his team showed how different morphology, control and locomotion strategies could be obtained based on varying stiffness of the tensegrity modules.

Dario Floreano has published hundreds of peer-reviewed articles, tens of patents, as well as five books on neural networks, evolutionary robotics, bio-inspired artificial intelligence, bio-inspired flying robots, and most recently on "How Intelligent Machines Will Shape Our Future". In 2017, Floreano was featured by The Economist in a centre-page portrait as a pioneer in evolutionary robotics and aerial robotics. He was co-founder and member of the Board of Directors of the International Society for Artificial Life, Inc., member of the Board of Governors of the International Society for Neural Networks, Advisory Board member of the Future and Emerging Technology division of the European Commission, and founding members and vice-chair of the General Agenda Council on Robotics of the World Economic Forum.

== Selected works ==
- Floreano, Dario; Nosengo, Nicola (2022). Tales from a Robotic World. How Intelligent Machines Will Shape Our Future. MIT Press. ISBN 978-0-262-04744-9.
- Paolillo, Antonio; Colella, Fabrizio; Nosengo, Nicola; Schiano, Fabrizio; Stewart, William John; Zambrano, Davide; Chappuis, Isabelle; Lalive, Rafael; Floreano, Dario (2022). "How to compete with robots by assessing job automation risks and resilient alternatives" (PDF). Science Robotics. 7 (65) eabg5561. doi:10.1126/scirobotics.abg5561. PMID 35417202. S2CID 248155895.
- Soria, Enrica; Schiano, Fabrizio; Floreano, Dario (2021). "Predictive control of aerial swarms in cluttered environments". Nature Machine Intelligence. 3 (6): 545–554. doi:10.1038/s42256-021-00341-y. S2CID 231832256.
- Ajanic, Enrico; Feroskhan, Mir; Mintchev, Stefano; Noca, Flavio; Floreano, Dario (2020). "Bioinspired wing and tail morphing extends drone flight capabilities". Science Robotics. 5 (47) eabc2897. doi:10.1126/scirobotics.abc2897. PMID 33115883. S2CID 225095530.
- Cacucciolo, Vito; Shintake, Jun; Kuwajima, Yu; Maeda, Shingo; Floreano, Dario; Shea, Herbert (2019). "Stretchable pumps for soft machines". Nature. 572 (7770): 516–519. Bibcode:2019Natur.572..516C. doi:10.1038/s41586-019-1479-6. PMID 31413364. S2CID 199577059.
- Shintake, Jun; Cacucciolo, Vito; Floreano, Dario; Shea, Herbert (2018). "Soft Robotic Grippers". Advanced Materials. 30 (29) e1707035. Bibcode:2018AdM....3007035S. doi:10.1002/adma.201707035. PMID 29736928. S2CID 13686166.
- Estrada, Matthew A.; Mintchev, Stefano; Christensen, David L.; Cutkosky, Mark R.; Floreano, Dario (2018). "Forceful manipulation with micro air vehicles". Advanced Materials. 3 (23) eaau6903. doi:10.1126/scirobotics.aau6903. PMID 33141736. S2CID 53781255.
- Floreano, Dario; Wood, Robert J. (2015). "Science, technology and the future of small autonomous drones". Nature. 521 (7553): 460–466. Bibcode:2015Natur.521..460F. doi:10.1038/nature14542. PMID 26017445. S2CID 4463263.
- Schaffter, Thomas; Marbach, Daniel; Floreano, Dario (2011). "GeneNet Weaver: In silico benchmark generation and performance profiling of network inference methods". Bioinformatics. 27 (16): 2263–2270. doi:10.1093/bioinformatics/btr373. PMID 21697125.
- Marbach, Daniel; Prill, Robert J.; Schaffter, Thomas; Mattiussi, Claudio; Floreano, Dario; Stolovitzky, Gustavo (2010). "Revealing strengths and weaknesses of methods for gene network inference". Proceedings of the National Academy of Sciences. 107 (14): 6286–6291. Bibcode:2010PNAS..107.6286M. doi:10.1073/pnas.0913357107. PMC 2851985. PMID 20308593.
- Floreano, Dario; Dürr, Peter; Mattiussi, Claudio (2008). "Neuroevolution: From architectures to learning". Evolutionary Intelligence. 1: 47–62. doi:10.1007/s12065-007-0002-4. S2CID 2942634.
- Floreano, Dario; Mattiussi, Claudio (22 August 2008). Bio-Inspired Artificial Intelligence: Theories, Methods, and Technologies. MIT Press. ISBN 978-0-262-30391-0.
- Nolfi, Stefano; Floreano, Dario (2000). Evolutionary Robotics: The Biology, Intelligence, and Technology of Self-Organizing Machines. MIT Press. ISBN 978-0-262-64056-5.
- Floreano, D.; Mondada, F. (1996). "Evolution of homing navigation in a real mobile robot". IEEE Transactions on Systems, Man, and Cybernetics - Part B: Cybernetics. 26 (3): 396–407. Bibcode:1996ITSMB..26..396F. doi:10.1109/3477.499791. PMID 18263042.
