= Thymio =

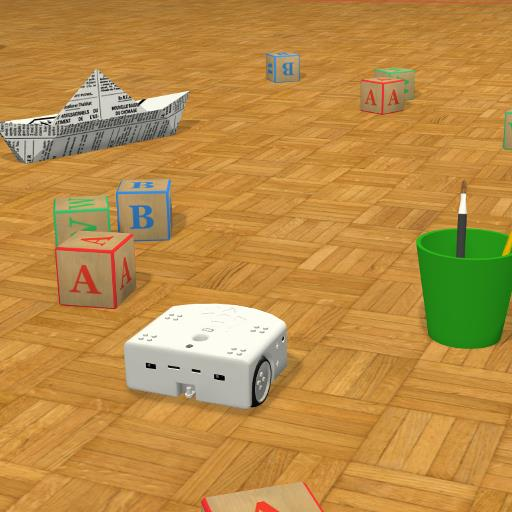
A Thymio II simulation model in Webots

Thymio II is an educational robot in the 100 Euros price range. The robot was developed at the EPFL in collaboration with ECAL, both in Lausanne, Switzerland. A purely-visual programming language was developed at ETH Zurich.

One of the unique features of these robots is its design, production, and commercialization by a full open-source and non-profit chain of actors. This very alternative approach has been justified by the educational goal of the project. The design has been mainly made by universities (EPFL, écal and ETHZ) within research programs (NCCR Robotics). Mechanics, electronics and software are open source. The company producing Thymio, called Mobsya is a non-profit organization.

Many articles have been written about how to teach with Thymio in the classroom including the article, "Classroom robotics: Motivating independent learning and discovery" on Robohub. Research and new Thymio projects are constantly being done as noted by IEEE. In 2020 Thymio's pedagogical design was evaluated by Education Alliance Finland. In the evaluation, a group of teacher-evaluators in Switzerland assessed Thymio's curriculum alignment, pedagogy, and usability through using a science-based product evaluation method, developed by Education Alliance Finland and Finnish educational researchers. The product evaluation was funded by Stiftung Mercator and as an outcome of the evaluation, Thymio was granted a pedagogical quality certification.

The robot is in production and distributors of Thymio include Sturiel.com and TechyKids.com.

== Simulation ==
A simulation model of the Thymio II compatible with Aseba Studio is available in Webots and a 3D interactive model of the robot can be found here.

== Contests ==
Since August 18, 2017, the Thymio II robot is used in various international online contest on Robotbenchmark.
