= Roboboa =

Robotic Snake

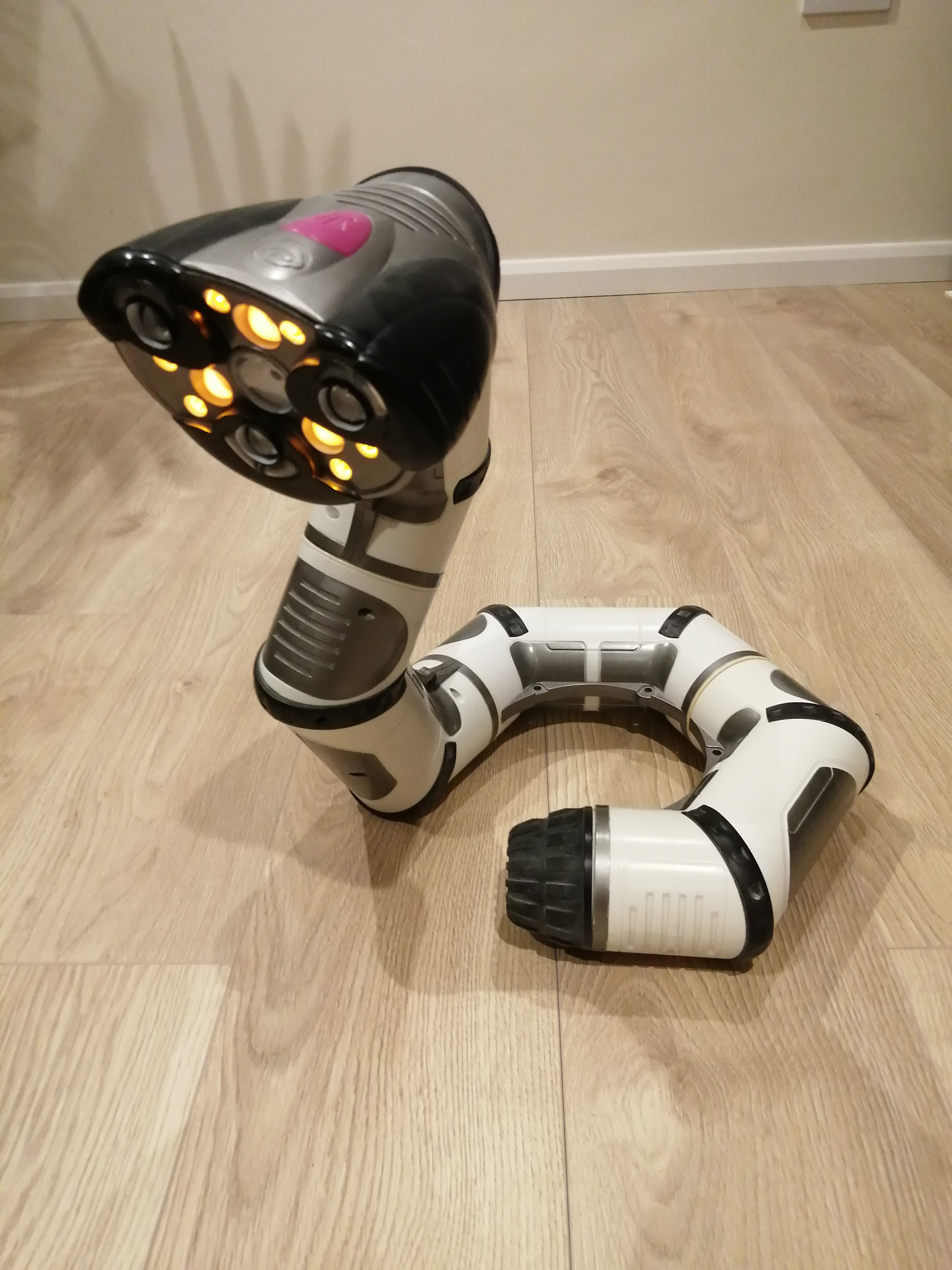
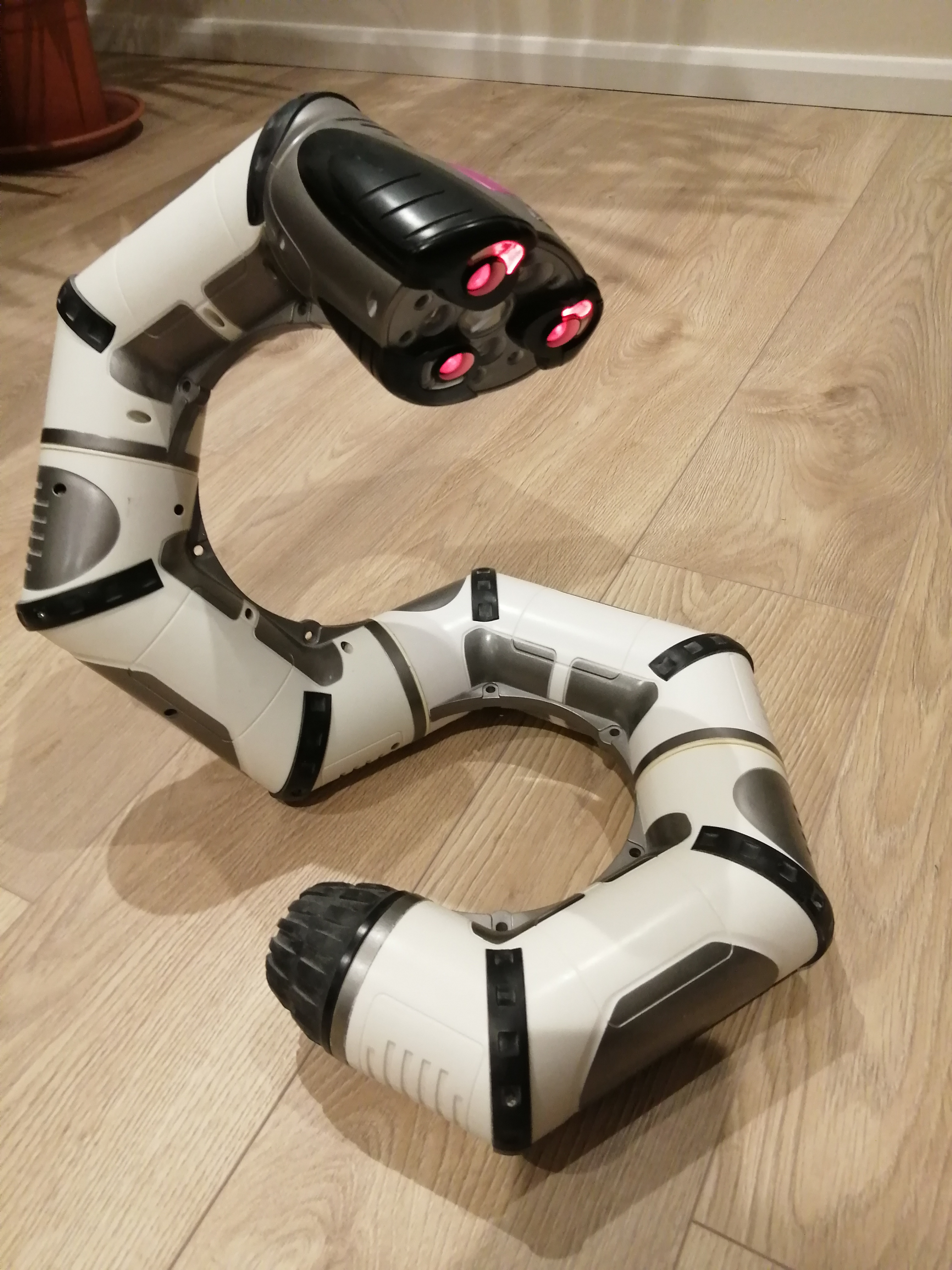

Roboboa is a robotic snake produced by WowWee. Roboboa has 4 angled body sections, allowing Roboboa to coil by rotating adjacent sections. A motorized tail roller and casters on the midsection allow Roboboa to move in a straight line.

== Hardware ==
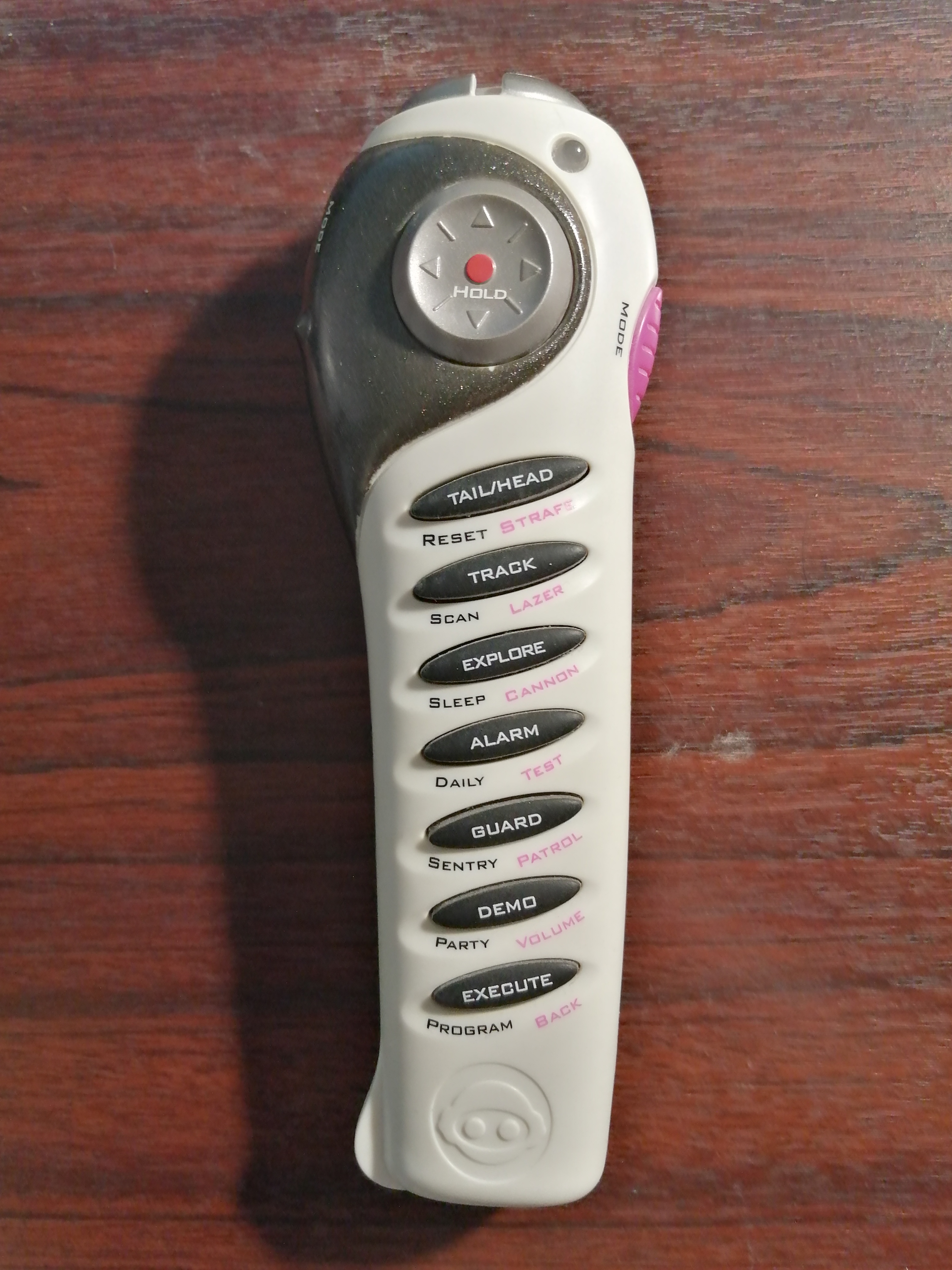
Roboboa Remote Control

Roboboa contains 4 motorized sections, infrared and light sensors and a speaker, with a separate remote controller. The body requires 4 D-cell batteries, and the remote requires 4 AAA batteries.

The remote has 7 action buttons, an 8-way directional pad, and 2 mode buttons. The remote also functions as a flashlight. The Strafe/Laser/Cannon functions allow Roboboa to send signals to other WowWee robots.

== Action buttons ==
Roboboa operates in distinct modes, accessed by pressing one of the action buttons. Secondary options are selectable by holding the action button down for 2 seconds, or by pressing a Mode button followed by an action button. Roboboa also has a Lighting Mode button on his head, which converts him into an area light After 1 hour, Roboboa will revert from Lighting Mode to Aware mode. In Aware Mode, Roboboa remains in place but will track movement and emit various sounds.

- Tail/Head:Reset:Strafe action button: Tail/Head toggles the 8-way directional pad to control either the head end or tail end of the Roboboa. Reset will clear all alarms, programs, and volume settings, and return Roboboa to the default position. Strafe sends IR command signals that are recognized by Robopet, Roboquad, and other Roboboas.
- Track:Scan:Lazer action button: In Track mode (as in Aware mode), Roboboa remains in place but will turn his light on and track nearby objects that are detected by IR. In Scan mode, Roboboa moves his head from left to right until an object is detected. Lazer sends IR command signals that are recognized by Roboreptile and Roboraptor.
- Explore:Sleep:Cannon action button: In Explore mode, Roboboa will wander in search of objects. Sleep causes Roboboa to curl up and suspend; programs and alarms are remembered, and alarm events will cause Roboboa to wake up. If no event occur within 24 hours of entering Sleep mode, Roboboa will enter Shutdown mode. Cannon sends IR command signals that are recognized by Robosapien and Robosapien V2.
- Alarm:Daily:Test action button: Selects one of three alarm modes. Pressing the Alarm button multiple times will set Roboboa to wake up and play an alarm that many hours in the future, i.e. two presses sets the Alarm for 2 hours. The maximum setting is 16 hours. Five seconds after the last press of Alarm, Roboboa will enter Sleep mode until the alarm time elapses. After setting an Alarm, it can be flagged as a daily recurring Alarm by holding the Alarm button for 2 seconds to activate Daily alarm mode. Test will demonstrate Roboboa's alarm sounds, lights and actions.
- Guard:Sentry:Patrol action button: Guard mode causes Roboboa to scan for objects within a range of several feet. Guard mode times out after 2 hours and Roboboa enters Aware mode. Sentry mode causes Roboboa to spin while scanning. If an object is detected, Roboboa will flash and then spin the opposite direction. Sentry mode times out after 20 minutes, followed by Aware mode. Patrol mode causes Roboboa to move randomly. After detecting an object, Roboboa will flash and then move in a new direction. Patrol mode times out after 10 minutes, followed by Aware mode.
- Demo:Party:Volume action button: Demo causes Roboboa to show his movement, sound and light capabilities. Party causes Roboboa to act as a disco light. Volume cycles through preset options of Loud, Medium, Soft and Off. Volume setting is lost after Reset.
- Execute:Program:Back action button: Execute will start a stored program of up to 40 commands. Program mode allows storing of commands, while Back removes the last command entered. The program is stored and played back by pressing the Execute button again.

Sleep mode: Roboboa will curl up and enter sleep mode if there has been no disturbance in 2 hours. If no alarms are set, Roboboa will enter Shutdown after 24 hours in Sleep mode.

== Programming ==
Roboboa can be 'programmed' by entering commands with the remote; up to 40 commands can be recorded and played back in sequence. Two conditional steps can pause the playback until either the light level changes, or an object passes in front of the IR sensor. Playback resumes after the event.
