= WowWee Alive Chimpanzee =

Animatronic chimpanzee robot

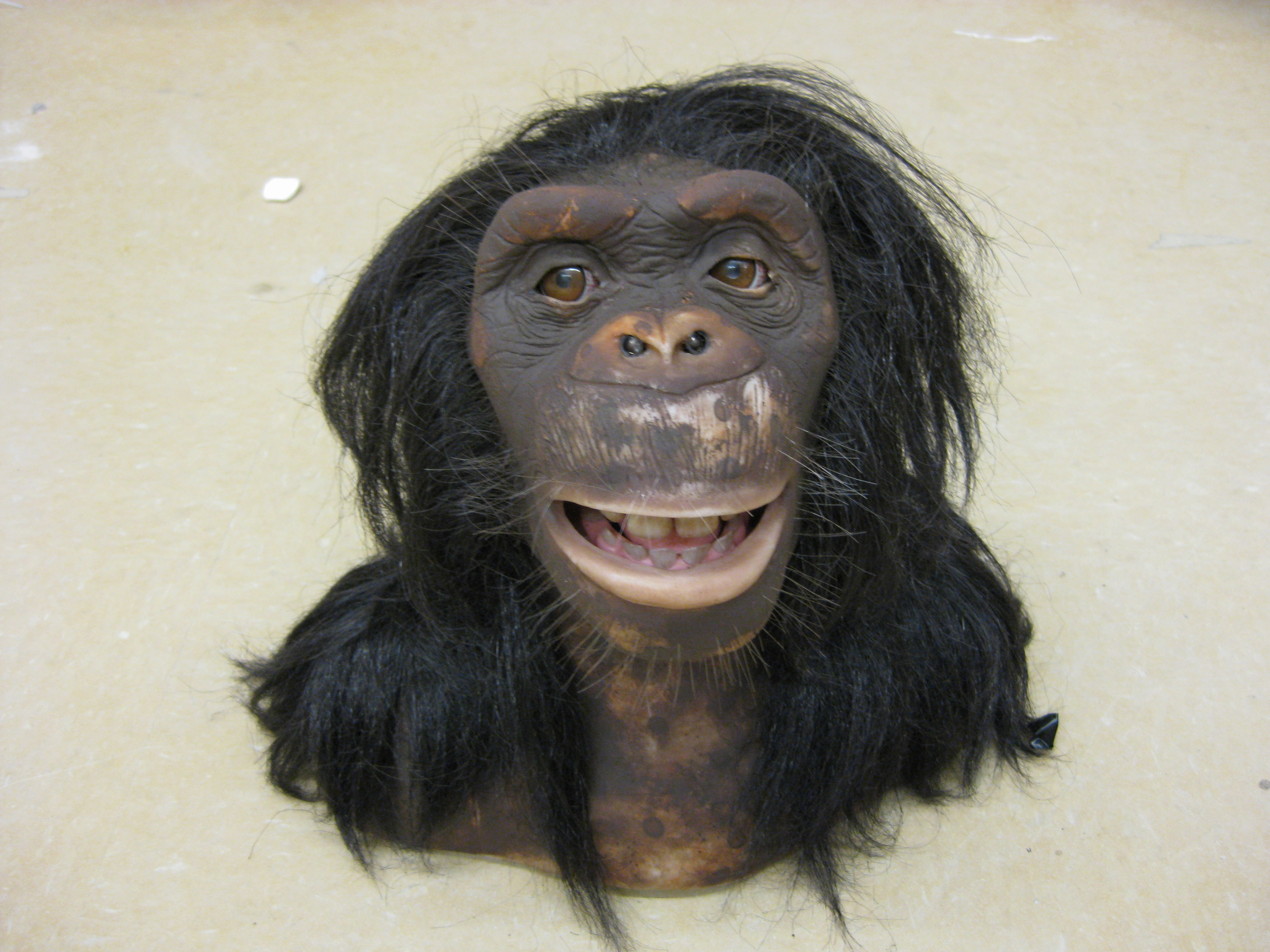
A WowWee Alive Chimpanzee at the Georgia Institute of Technology

The Alive Chimpanzee is produced by WowWee Alive, a division of WowWee Ltd. The animatronic Chimpanzee is the first in WowWee Alive's product line. Unlike WowWee's other robots, the Chimpanzee only consists of the head of a chimpanzee. It houses eight motors to mimic the facial expressions of a real chimp. It also contains 9 sensors, including IR sensors in the eyes, touch sensors on the chin, top and rear of the head and sound and vibration sensors in the ear. There is also an Alive Elvis manufactured.

In attempting to make the Chimpanzee as realistic as possible, each strand of hair is rooted individually into the skin of the robot and the skin moves, is colored to match realistic skin tones, and includes detailed veining. As with other WowWee robots, the Chimpanzee can be operated in different modes; in its case, the modes are Alive, Guard, Program, Demo and Sleep.

A Popular Science article on Halloween decorating describes how one can remove the robot's skin to create a Terminator-like robot face.

== Features ==
Some of the Chimpanzee's notable features are:

- Mood dependent behavior: responds to stimuli with mood specific animations and sounds
- Infrared vision system: detects movement, tracks objects and reacts to human interaction
- Touch sensors in his chin, head and ears
- Stereo sound sensors detect loud sounds
- Remote control or autonomous interactivity
- Visual and sonic guard mode
- Program mode
- Sleep mode

Four Moods:

- Curious
- Fearful
- Happy
- Angry

Modes of Operation:

- Alive: default mode. Reacts to sensory input, and performs autonomous actions.
- Direct Control: responds to user commands.
- Program: Up to 20 distinct steps (movements and sounds) can be entered in an ordered sequence that will be stored and can be played back at a later time.
- Guard: Uses the vision and sound sensors to detect intruders around it, and reacts in response, either with a random animation or if a program has been entered.
- Demo: runs through 2 or 3 random animations.
- Sleep: the Chimpanzee will power down after a preset amount of time without activity.

== See also ==
- AIBO
- Humanoid robot
- Roboraptor
- Roboreptile
- Robosapien v2
- WowWee
