= Robopanda =

Robopanda is a robotic interactive companion produced by WowWee. The Robopanda uses interchangeable cartridges that contain personalities, stories and songs, and is controlled directly by touch and sound sensors. Robopanda is labeled for use by children ages 9 and up.

== Hardware ==
- 8 motors
- Sound sensor
- Capacitive touch sensors
- Tilt sensor
- Safety/pinch sensors
- Minipanda accessory with RFID tag
- Two cartridges

The Robopanda is animated by 8 motors, controlling its arms, legs, head tilt, head rotate, eyebrows and ears. Touch sensors are located in hands, feet, head, belly and back. A tilt sensor is used to sense when Robopanda is lying down, leaning, or being carried. An RFID sensor in the belly is used to detect the presence of the minipanda accessory. Safety/pinch sensors in the armpits and back of neck will inhibit motion if triggered. Robopanda requires 6 x C and 4 x AA size batteries.

== Modes ==
Robopanda operates in three different modes controlled by a 3 way power switch: Training mode, Friend mode, or Menu mode. After 4 minutes without touch input, Robopanda will enter Sleep mode. The power/mode switch must be manually turned off and on again to exit Sleep mode. In Training mode, Robopanda will explain his various functions and sensors. Volume may also be adjusted while in Training mode by moving an arm (volume up) or leg (volume down). In Friend mode, Robopanda will converse, tell jokes and ask for touch stimulation. Robopanda will also recognize the minipanda accessory (with embedded RFID) when in Friend mode. Menu mode is broken down into 3 'settings' that are accessed by the touch sensors: touching a foot enters Free Roam setting; touching the belly enters the Games setting; touching a hand enters the Tricks setting; and touching a head sensor enters the Song/Story setting. The back touch sensor is used to return to the main menu of Menu mode.

== Programming ==
Robopanda can be 'programmed' by moving its arms and legs while in the Tricks setting of Training mode. Robopanda will then play back the sequence of movements; this is similar to the Puppet mode in other WowWee robots such as Robosapien v2. The program memory holds a limited number of movements, and the sequence of moves is retained in the cartridge only while it is inserted in Robopanda. The behavior of Robopanda can be changed by inserting a different personality cartridge.
