= FlyTech Dragonfly =

US flying toy

The Flytech Dragonfly is a remote-controlled flying toy manufactured by WowWee. The Dragonfly has been incorrectly billed as the world's first commercially available RC ornithopter (flapping wing aircraft). It was actually preceded by several other products, including Hobbytechnik's Skybird, Park Hawk, and Slow Hawk radio controlled ornithopters, and the Cybird radio-controlled ornithopter from Neuros.

The Dragonfly is made from lightweight but strong materials and has a crash-resistant structure. It is rechargeable and has multiple modes for beginner and advanced users. The Dragonfly is not a robot like the majority of WowWee's current products, such as the Robosapien and the Roboreptile. Replacement wings are available for purchase.

== History ==
The Dragonfly was invented by Sean Frawley and Dan Getz who began experimenting with ornithopters while they were still teenagers. The four-winged design of the Dragonfly was based on a previous rubber-band-powered ornithopter kit designed by Nathan Chronister and manufactured by The Ornithopter Zone. It also uses the same flapping wing design as the DelFly. The newly available micro-sized motors and batteries developed for cellular telephones made it possible to build an electric-powered, radio-controlled version. Mr. Frawley has since earned a degree in aerospace engineering from Embry-Riddle Aeronautical University and now works for WowWee. The Dragonfly was first introduced at the January 2007 CES show in Las Vegas, and was being sold in RadioShack stores in the United States in February 2007.

== Hardware ==
The Dragonfly is made of lightweight materials that are strong and crash-resistant. Its gears and internal frame are made of Delrin. These parts, and its other internal electronics, are protected by a body molded from Expanded Polypropylene. Carbon fiber rods give the Dragonfly's wings strength, while Mylar film give them lift and thrust. At 25 grams, its very light nature makes it easily susceptible to gentle wind currents.

The Dragonfly operates for approximately 5 to 10 (rarely 15) minutes on a single charge of its lithium polymer battery. The Dragonfly recharges by plugging into its remote control unit, which itself requires 6 AA batteries. Charging time is about 20 minutes.

== Other versions ==
- FlyTech Dragonfly comes in multiple colors, blue and green are the most commercially available, while red/orange ones are less common.
- One version of the Dragonfly is designed to resemble Barry B. Benson from the 2007 DreamWorks animated film Bee Movie.
- A Toys-R-Us exclusive variant called the Hornet had a more wasp-like body.
