= Fingerlings (toy) =

Line of robotic toys

Fingerlings monkey toy from 2017, designed after the pygmy marmoset

Fingerlings is a toy line released in 2017 by WowWee. The toy is a robotic creature that wraps around a finger and reacts to touch and sound with actions like blinking and blowing kisses. Fingerlings Hugs are larger plush toys that have the same interactivity.

In the 2017 Christmas season Fingerlings were a hit, and so called "Grinch bots" bought out Fingerlings on online retail sites to resell for higher prices. Following this, legislation was proposed in the United States to ban the bots.

== Features ==
Fingerlings are capable of over 40 different sounds and reactions, including singing, blinking, burping, and farting. With built-in microphones and motion sensors, they react differently depending on how they are interacted with. The original lineup was designed to resemble the pygmy marmoset, an animal that Sydney Wiseman, WowWee's brand manager and niece of the company's owners, has been "obsessed" with since childhood.

== History ==
Fingerlings were released in the UK and Canada in the spring of 2017. They launched in the United States in August 2017, where they exploded in popularity. WowWee created exclusive products for major retailers—a glitter-covered monkey for Amazon.com, the sloth for Walmart, and a unicorn for Toys "R" Us. Later Fingerlings releases include creatures like pandas and dragons.

In 2018, WowWee released Fingerlings Hugs for the Holiday season. The interactive plush toy is much bigger than the original Fingerlings, but have the same interactivity. The Fingerlings Hugs monkeys have long arms that kids can wrap around themselves.

=== Controversy ===
The toy became the #1 toy for Christmas 2017. Online shopping bots, known as "Grinch bots", named after a fictional Dr Seuss character who "stole Christmas", rapidly purchased bulk orders of Fingerlings from retail websites and sold them on secondary marketplaces like eBay and Amazon.com for a much higher price.

U.S. Senator Chuck Schumer noticed the trend and stated, "Grinch bots cannot be allowed to steal Christmas, or dollars", and proposed legislation that would ban bots on retail sites, expanding the existing Better Online Tickets Sales Act (BOTS Act), which already prohibits bulk purchasing concert or theater tickets.

== See also ==
- Aquapet, interactive, electronic toys
- Internet bot
