= Paper jam =

Paper jam may refer to:

- The situation where paper gets stuck in a computer printer
- Mario & Luigi: Paper Jam, a 2015 video game
- Paper Jamz, a defunct toyline
