= RS Media =

The RS Media is a product in WowWee's line of biomorphic robots, based on a walking system designed by Mark Tilden. The RS Media's body is based on the Robosapien V2, but its software is based on a Linux kernel. As the name implies, the RS Media's focus is on multimedia capabilities, including the ability to record and playback audio, pictures and video. It has a similar sensor array and programmability to the Robosapien V2.

Unlike previous products in WowWee's Robo line of products, the RS Media is the first to feature bundled PC software. There are 4 applications: the BodyCon Editor, the Personality Editor, the Macro Editor, and the Media Organizer.

The RS Media was released in October 2006 in Australia and the UK.

== Personalities ==
A personality is a collection of audio responses. The RS Media ships with 4 personalities that the user can switch among using the remote control:

- RS Media (default)
- Service Bot 3000 - an English butler
- Space Bot - a fictional space captain
- Billy-Joe Sapien - a cowboy

Users may also modify the existing personalities or create their own from scratch, using the provided Personality Editor software.

== Multimedia features ==
The RS Media is capable of recording and playing MP3's, MPEG4's, JPEG's, and Java applications. It comes with 3 Java games that are controlled with the remote control and displayed to its LCD screen. It can also be used as an audio player via the stereo line-in port. The built-in memory can be supplemented by inserting an SD memory card (up to 1GB in size) into the SD slot.

== Programming ==
Like other WowWee robots, the RS Media can be programmed to execute sequences of moves and audio clips either as a standalone program or as a reaction to a sound, touch or visual stimulus. The RS Media has the same programming mode as the V2, Puppet Mode, where the user can manually bend and move the robot's body parts to create a program. The most sophisticated way to program the RS Media is by use of the computer applications.

== Hacking ==
As with other Robosapien models, the RS Media was designed with the possibility for modifications. In reference to the philosophy behind the 'hackability' of the robots, Tilden once said, "Years ago some bright AI lads asked if I could build a competent humanoid cradle into which they could put their smart programs. Took me a while, but here it is lads, inexpensive and ready to go right out of the box. Make it think, and let me know how it goes."

In the spring of 2009, a user named Helibot from the RoboCommunity created a new driver to allow access to the Robot's Linux operating system via the USB port and a terminal program. This is now a part of the RSMedia Development Kit.
