= Puku (disambiguation) =

The term puku can have several meanings:

- Puku A medium sized Antelope found in wet grasslands in southern parts of Africa.
- Puku is a dialect of the ut-Ma'in language of Nigeria
- Puku is a dialect of the Noho language of Cameroon
- Puku is the name of an Aquapet toy
- Puku is a Japanese counter word
- Puku is a Māori term used as a loanword in New Zealand English, meaning belly or centre. It found in several place names
  - Te Puku, an island of Tokelau
  - Te Puku O Te Whenua, a former New Zealand electorate
