= Machine of Human Dreams =

2016 documentary film

- Directed by: Roy Cohen
- Produced by: Mike Lerner; Roy Cohen
- Cinematography: Richard Gillespie
- Edited by: Gregor Lyon
- Music by: Ellyott
- Release date: 11 June 2016 (Sheffield DocFest)
- Running time: 1 hr. 15 mins.
- Countries: UK, Israel
- Language: English

Machine of Human Dreams is a 2016 documentary film written and directed by Roy Cohen. The film focuses on artificial intelligence researcher Dr. Ben Goertzel, known for his work on OpenCog, an open-source artificial general intelligence (AGI) platform.

The film offers a portrait of Goertzel's decades-long quest to create a thinking machine, and captures his idealism, technological struggles and the human drive fueling scientific ambition.

== Summary ==
With financial backing from the Hong Kong government, Ben Goertzel aims to fulfill his long-standing ambition of creating human-level artificial intelligence through software modeled on the human mind. Gathering a specialized team, the researcher is developing functional, reasoning humanoid robots. However, mounting pressure from investors and scrutiny over his previous ventures highlight the complex realities and potential limitations of his pursuit.

== Cast ==
- Ben Goertzel as Self
- Mandeep Bhatia as Self
- Carol Goertzel as Self
- Gwen Aranya Goertzel as Self
- David Hanson as Self
- Aaron D. Nitzkin as Self
- Lisa Pazer as Self
- Ken Silverman as Self
- Mark W. Tilden as Self
- Gino Yu as Self

== Production ==
Director Cohen first met Goertzel at a conference in New York, where he became interested in Goertzel's combination of visionary goals and practical attempts to develop a "thinking machine." The documentary was filmed over several years across multiple international locations, including laboratories at Hong Kong, and research projects in Addis Ababa, Ethiopia. It also features Goertzel's collaborations with Hanson Robotics, the company known for developing expressive humanoid robots such as the Einstein prototypes.

Cohen documented both the progress and setbacks of Goertzel's work, including instances of malfunctioning prototypes and challenges in securing financial support.

== Release ==
Machine of Human Dreams had it UK premiere at Sheffield DocFest on 11 June 2016. It had its North American premiere at Doc NYC on 13 November 2016. In 2017, the film was subsequently screened at several film festivals in Europe, including Krakow Film Festival, Docville and CPH:DOX.

== Reception ==
Machine of human Dreams won Best Technology Film of the Year from Russia's Polytechnic Museum.

=== Critical reviews ===
Owen Herman of UK Film Review noted that while the personal story is compelling, the documentary ultimately "barely scratches the surface" of its subject. Dayana Sobri of e27 described Machine of Human Dreams as "intellectually engaging for the inquiring minds and entertaining enough for the general public."
