= Roy Cohen =

Israeli filmmaker and journalist

- Born: 1985
- Education: Harvard University; Cornell Tech
- Occupations: Filmmaker; Journalist

Roy Cohen (Hebrew: רועי כהן) is an Israeli filmmaker, journalist and public health official. His work spans across documentary filmmaking and journalistic writing, with contributions to The Guardian and Israeli outlets such as +972 Magazine and Local Call.

Cohen was named by Globes as one of Israel's "40 Leaders Under 40." He serves as head of the Big Data Department at the Israeli Ministry of Health, where he leads TIMNA, the national research infrastructure for healthcare data.

== Early life and education ==
Cohen was born in 1985 in Ashdod, Israel. He studied neuroscience at Harvard University and studied Media and Information Sciences at Cornell Tech.

== Career ==
Cohen worked as a research assistant at the Massachusetts Institute of Technology and Harvard University, where he conducted a study on the psychological effects of dialogue on individuals from conflict regions, which received the Thomas T. Hoopes Prize and the Gordon Allport Prize. His 2014 short film, Real Value, was commissioned by the UK's community channel.

In January 2015, Cohen published an essay titled "The Truth About Gaza" in The Montréal Review. Written in an absurdist style, the piece reflects on Israeli perceptions of Gaza. Cohen uses the refrain that "Gaza is not a real place" as a rhetorical device to critique how political narratives, media coverage, and repeated cycles of violence have shaped public consciousness in Israel.

In 2016, Cohen directed his first feature-length documentary Machine of Human Dreams about artificial intelligence researcher Ben Goertzel and his effort to develop artificial general intelligence. The film premiered at Sheffield Doc/Fest, and was distributed by Dogwoof. It won Best Technology Film of the Year from Russia's Polytechnic Museum.

In 2022, Cohen published an essay in the Guardian about his friendship with Palestinian Aseel Aslih and their membership in Seeds of Peace. It was long listed for One World Media Popular Features Award that year. His documentary Far From Maine, following an Israeli man who's compelled to deal with the violent and long-forgotten death of his Palestinian friend, was selected for 2023 Thessaloniki Doc Fest’s Pitching Forum.

In 2023, Cohen was named by Globes newspaper as one of Israel’s “40 Leaders Under 40”. He received the Cayton-Goldrich Family Foundation Fellowship through Film Independent's Artist Development Program, in support of his nonfiction film Far from Maine. He was among the signatories of an open letter by Jewish creatives supporting Jonatham Glazer’s Oscar acceptance speech.

In 2026, Cohen released "Far from Maine" at the International Film Festival Rotterdam.

== Personal life ==
Cohen lives in Tel Aviv with his husband, technology executive Toby Stein, and their daughter.
