= Robosapien v2 =

Robotic toy

The Robosapien V2 is the second generation of Mark Tilden's RoboSapien robot. It is nearly twice the size of the original robot, standing around 1.85 feet (56 cm) tall. Instead of the original caveman grunts, the V2 can speak a large list of pre-recorded phrases. It has infrared and basic color recognition sensors, grip sensors in its hands, touch or contact activated hand and foot sensors, and sonic sensors. For movement, the V2 has an articulated waist, shoulders, and hands giving him a variety of body animations.

== Overview ==
The Robosapien V2 model was designed by Mark Tilden and is an autonomous robot. The Robosapien V2 comes packaged with a remote, a bowling ball with three pins, and the robot. It is an "evolved" form of Robosapien V1.

== Additional features ==
The V2 comes with a repertoire of sayings and animations which can be activated from the remote control. Features from the original Robosapien such as burp and fart are included, along with a parody of the Lost In Space robot's "Danger, Will Robinson!" and many other one-liners.

Much of the V2's internal behavior can be deduced by the blinking patterns of his blue eye pads, which change as the V2 changes modes.

== Variants ==
=== Colors ===
In addition to the white/black color scheme, there are additional colored variants of Robosapien V2 which include bronze, red, blue and black.

=== Mini Robosapien V2 ===
A smaller version of the toy titled "Mini Robosapien V2" has also been produced. As with the standard Mini Robosapien it does not have a remote control or different modes of behavior, and isn't an autonomous robot. The product runs on two AAA-size batteries and can only move forward in one direction. The product also has red eyes instead of the standard blue.

== See also ==
- WowWee
- Humanoid robot
- Roboraptor
- Roboreptile
- WowWee Alive Chimpanzee
- Robotics
