= Seropi =

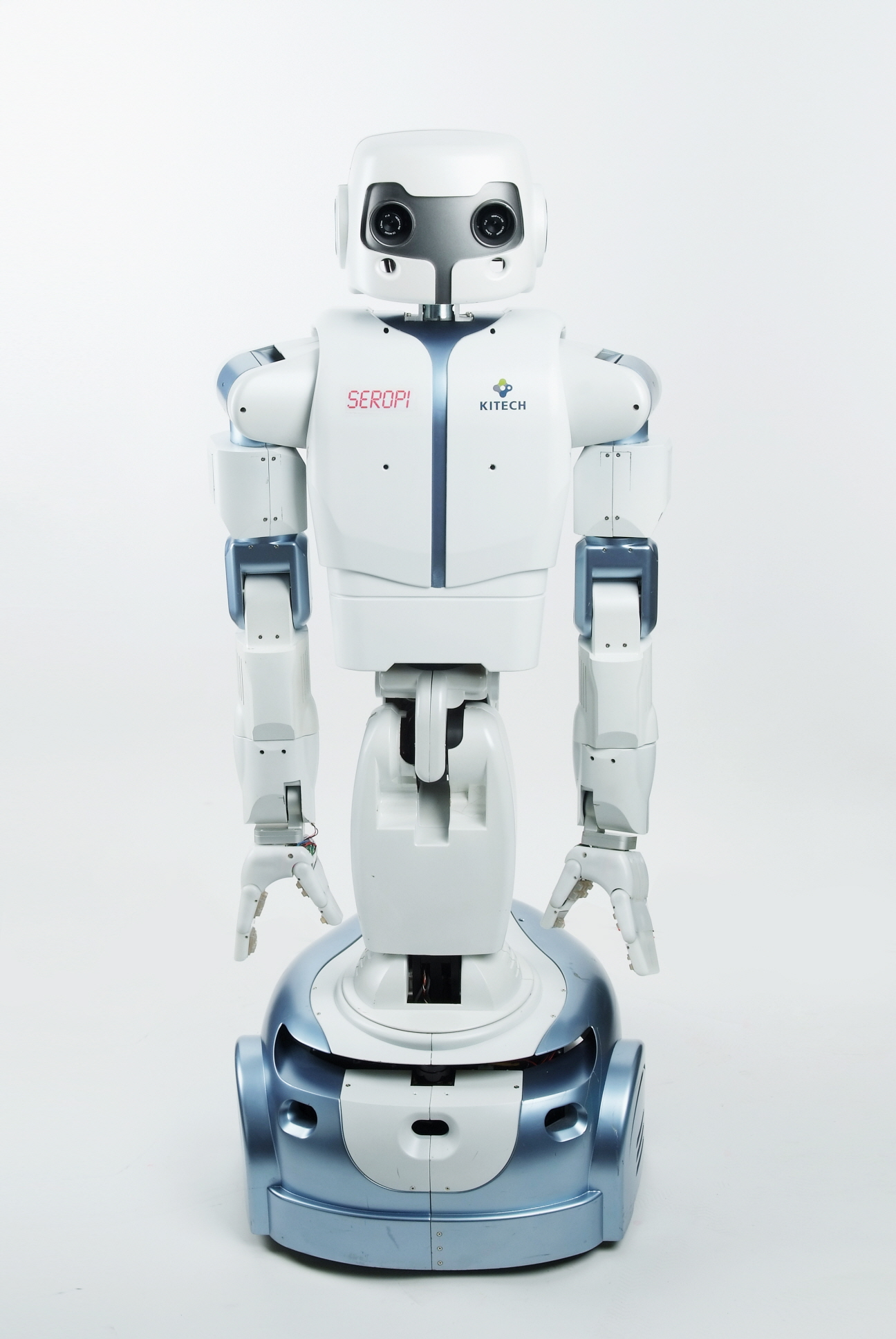
SEROPI (Service Robot Platform Initiative)

SEROPI (Korean: 세로피, Service Robot Platform Initiative) is a wheel based humanoid robot developed by KITECH (Korea Institute of Industrial Technology).

Since SEROPI has a human-like shape, it can effectively work within a human-friendly working space for visitor guidance, errand, and guard. SEROPI consists of three DOFs (Degree Of Freedom) of the neck, three DOFs of the waist, six DOFs of the two arms, and one DOF of the knee. Because of these joint structures, SEROPI can flexibly grip an object on a table or floor with the three fingers and transfer the object to some place. It is also self-balancing and moves as a quick human walking. In the future, SEROPI could be used as a service robot platform equipped with touch sensors such that SEROPI can more safely perform the services like guidance, errand, and guard in a human-interactive environment such as a place of business or an exhibition hall.

== Specifications ==
- Dimension: 450x1250x450 mm (WHD).
- Weight: 55 kg.
- DOF: Hand 2DOF, Arm 6×2DOF, Waist 3DOF, Knee 1DOF, Neck 3DOF.
- Moving Velocity: Maximum 2 m/s.
- Working Area: from ground to eyesight.
- Hand Payload: 1 kg.
- Equipped Sensors: IR sensors, Scanning laser range finder, Force sensor, Force/Torque sensor, stereo vision, INS.

== Functions and features ==
- Prevention of collision with humans or objects by using 3-dimensional space perception sensors.
- Large working (including the ground) area by using diverse and multiple joints like waist and knee.
- Balance control by using the whole-body coordination and the four load-cell sensors at the bottom of the mobility.
- Fast movement using four-wheel mobility instead of biped walking.
- Diverse human-robot interactions by using voice, object recognition, face recognition, conversation, handshaking, etc.

== Software architecture ==
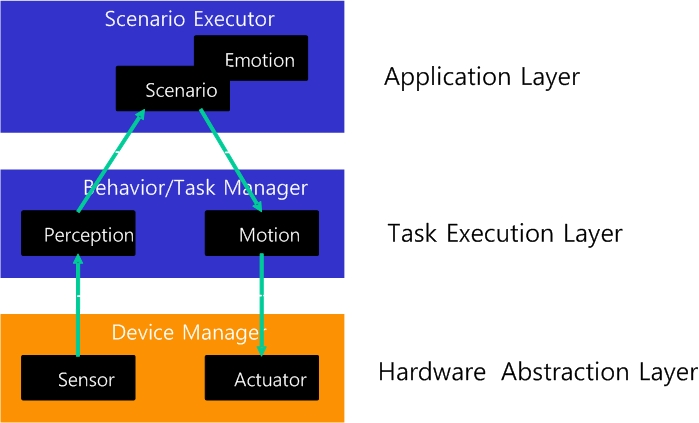
SEROPI S/W Architecture

Three-layered software architecture, which can provide flexibility, maintainability, reusability and scalability is used when an effective robot software design is needed. The HAL (Hardware Abstract Layer) provides a relatively uniform abstraction for aggregates of underlying hardware such that the underlying robotic hardware is transparent to the robot control software. This robot control software can be written in a hardware independent manner.
