= Roboquad =

Robotic toy

Referred to as "The first true robotic arthropod," Roboquad is one of the 5 robots that WowWee announced at CES in January 2007. It is a 4-legged robot that somewhat resembles a spider and a dog. Also designed by Mark Tilden, the Roboquad, like other WowWee robots, has multiple personalities, awareness of its surroundings, some autonomous behaviour and can be controlled via a remote.

== Features ==
- Five Scanning Sequences

1. Smart Scan: examines its surroundings and reacts to changes
2. Scan Left and Right: turns and faces any nearby object
3. Approach Nearest Object: moves towards the closest object it detects
4. Escape Walk: moves towards the largest open space it finds
5. Flinch Response: reacts to rapidly approaching objects

- Five Usage Modes:

1. Direct Control: user controlled movement
2. Autonomous Mode: self-directed interaction with its environment
3. Guard Mode: similar to Guard Mode on other WowWee bots, Roboquad reacts to noises and movement with sound effects.
4. Sleep: falls asleep after 5 minutes and powers down after 24 hours.
5. Demo: features a dance routine

- Edge Detection
- Remote Control: for controlling movement, programming, and adjusting personalities
- 72 Preprogrammed functions
- 40 programmable moves
- Demo Mode

== Hardware ==
- 4x leg motors
- 4x leg motor position sensors
- 2x head and neck motors (its head can swivel around completely)
- 2x lens-focused, face-mounted deep Infrared vision (13 ft range)
- 1x microphone
- 1x light sensor
- 1x Infrared remote control
- Requires 4 x C and 3 x AAA size batteries

== Personalities ==
Like other WowWee robots, the Roboquad has multiple 'personalities' which are dubbed 'States'. Those states are State of Awareness, State of Aggression and State of Activity, and they can each be set to low, medium or high. In the Awareness state, it spends more time scanning its surroundings. When its Aggression state is increased, its behaviour simulates anger and aggression and finally the higher the Activity state, the further and faster the Roboquad will wander.

With its light, sound and IR sensors, Roboquad is pre-programmed to simulate reactions to external stimuli and acts accordingly.

== Movement and Autonomy ==
The Roboquad's legs all swivel around and so it is able to walk forward, backwards and sideways at about the same rate and mobility. Its head is also able to swivel around completely, so it is able to scan its surroundings without turning its body.

In addition to its adjustable personalities (States), Roboquad's 5 different scanning sequences (described above in Features) are modulated according to how the personalities are tuned.

The documentation states that Roboquad's infrared sensors are sensitive enough to allow it to navigate doorways.
