= FemiSapien =

Robotic toy

FemiSapien is a female humanoid robot that WowWee announced at CES in January 2008. It can respond to sight, sound, and touch and can be programmed with a sequence of movements. At CES 2008 an estimated release date of late summer and $99 MSRP were given, and was being sold for $89.99 in 2009.

== Features ==
- Three modes of interaction.

1. Learning Mode: can be programmed with a sequence of movements.
2. Responsive Mode: make her responds to walking commands, and also you can interact with her as she reacts to your sounds, or watch her perform comedy scenes with you or another robot.
3. Attentive Mode: you can activate actions such as autonomous wandering, blowing kisses, poses, holding hands, dancing, belching, and she will even engage you in "conversation"!

- Ability to control other WowWee robots.
- Ability to respond/dance to music.

== Specifications ==
Dimensions:

- Length: 4 in (10 cm)
- Height: 15 in (38 cm)
- Width: 8 in (20 cm)
- Weight: 1.5 pounds (0.68 kg)
- 5 x motors (with joint position sensors)
- 4 x position switches in each joystick hand access up to 56 functions
- 1 x IR receiver
- 2 x IR transmitters
- 1 x microphone to detect words, music and sharp noises
- 1 x speaker with nearly 90 seconds of sound
- 2 x tilt sensors for forwards and backwards fall detection
- Requires 6 "AA" alkaline batteries
