= Cosmobot =

Prototype telerehabilitation robot

CosmoBot is a prototype telerehabilitation robot designed to treat children with disabilities such as Autism Spectrum disorders, Down Syndrome, cerebral palsy, muscular dystrophy, apraxia, neurodevelopmental disorders, and language developmental disorders.

== See also ==
- Autism therapies
- Autism friendly
- Educational Psychology
- Physical Therapy
- Telerobotics
- Voice command device
