= Paper Jamz =

Musical toy line produced by WowWee

- Type: Musical toy
- Company: WowWee
- Country: China
- Availability: 2010–unknown (likely discontinued)
- Official website

Paper Jamz was a collection of musical toys, produced by WowWee. Introduced in 2010, Paper Jamz were paper-thin musical toys, which included guitars, microphones, keytars, drum kits, and amplifiers. They were also marketed as "Instant Rock Star" instruments.

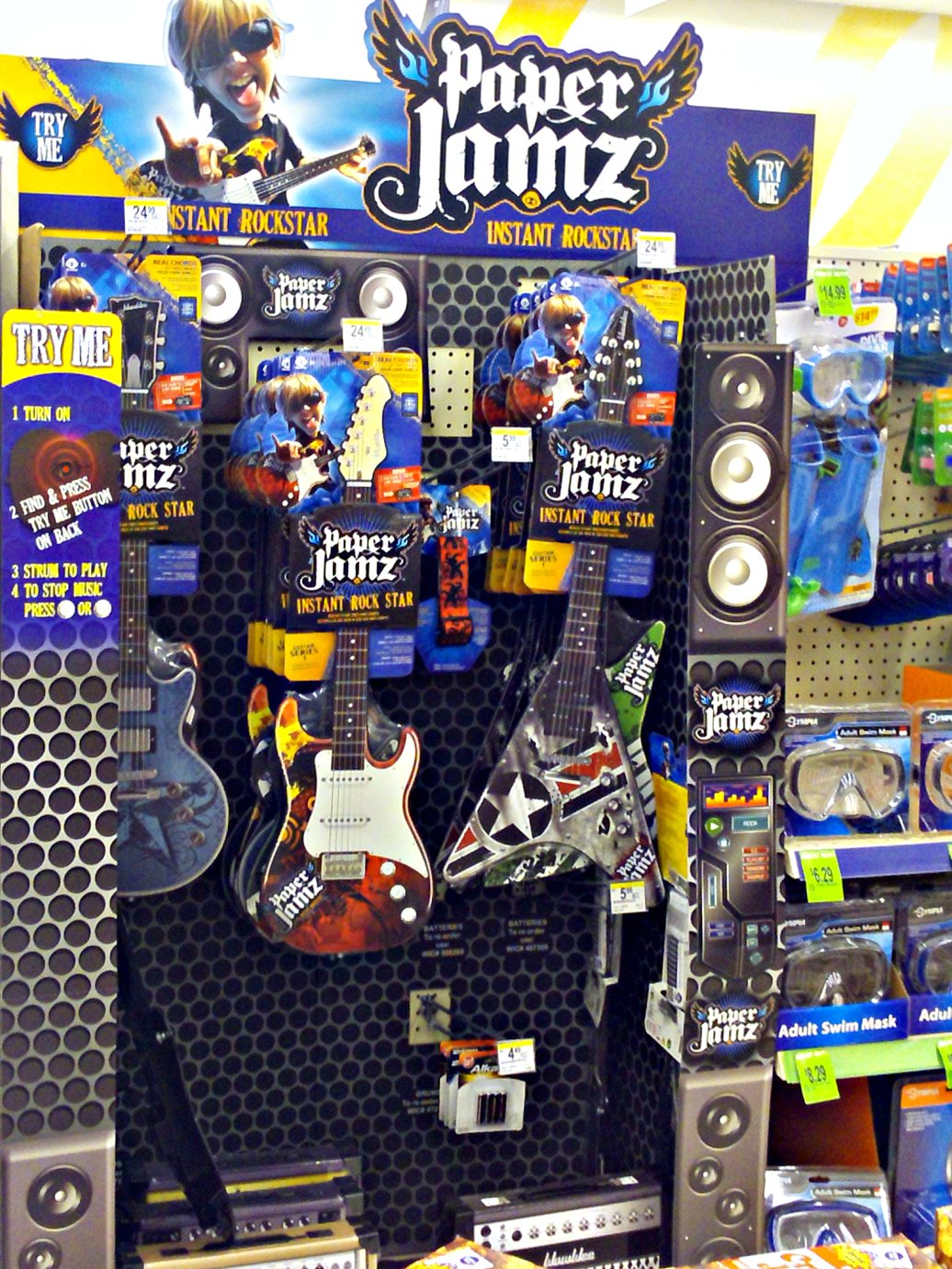
Walmart display of Paper Jamz Instant Rock Star electronic musical toys

== Description ==
There were no physical buttons, knobs or keys used while playing the instruments. Instead, the battery-operated instruments featured a printed, touch-and-gesture enabled surface. The toy company produced Justin Bieber themed guitars in 2011.

== Lawsuit ==
Gibson Guitar Corporation filed a lawsuit November 18. 2010 in Federal court, the Central District of California, against WowWee USA and their Paper Jamz guitars, alleging trademark infringement. The lawsuit claimed that the Paper Jamz guitars copied the looks of some of Gibson's famous guitars, the Gibson Les Paul, the Gibson Flying V, the Gibson Explorer, and the Gibson SG. On December 21, 2010 Gibson was granted a request for an injunction against WowWee and retailers in the United States which were selling Paper Jamz guitars: Walmart, Amazon, Big Lots stores, Kmart Corporation, Target Corporation, Toys "R" Us, Walgreens, Brookstone, Best Buy, eBay, Toywiz.com, and Home Shopping Network (HSN).

The case was dismissed with prejudice January 11, 2011 by Federal Judge R. Gary Klausner. According to Gibson CEO, Henry Juszkiewicz, WowWee later paid Gibson an undisclosed amount of money to license the likeness of Gibson guitars.

Paper Jamz products continued manufacture into 2011 and then seem to have ceased production.
