= Roboraptor =

Robotic toy

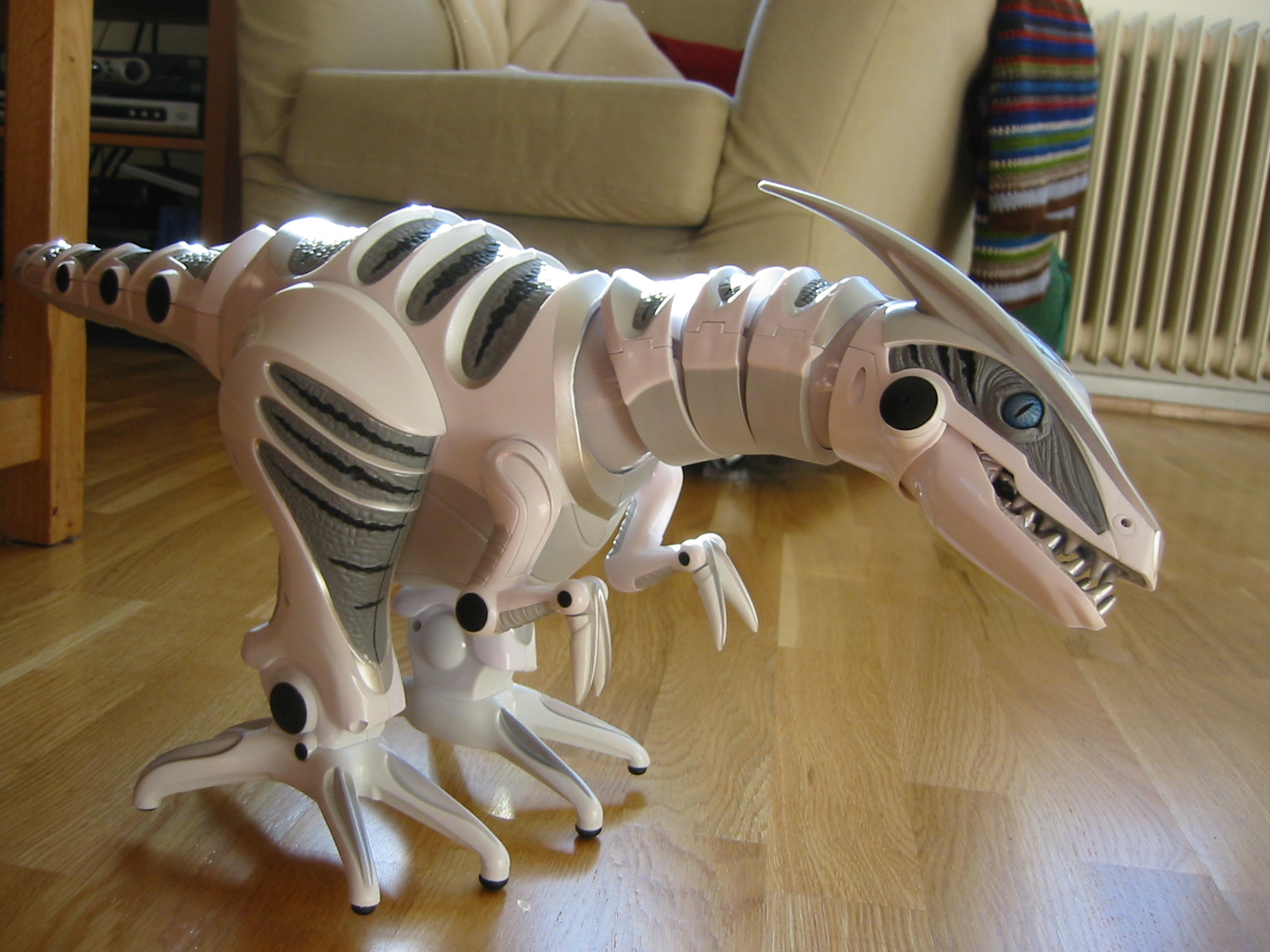
- Invented by: Mark Tilden; Michael Bellantoni
- Company: WowWee
- Slogan: A 32” Long Fusion of Technology and Wild Individuality
- Official website

Roboraptor is a robotic toy invented by Mark Tilden and Michael Bellantoni in 2004, and then distributed by WowWee Toys International. It is the successor to the RoboSapien robot and uses motion technology based on realistic biomechanics that give it fluid and natural movements. It has a multi-function remote control that uses infrared technology to talk to it. Unlike the original RoboSapien, the Roboraptor is capable of autonomous movement, using 3 realistic gaits.

== Sensors ==
Roboraptor comes with several sensors that allow it to monitor and interact with its environment. It features infrared, stereo sound, and touch sensors on its head, chin, tail, and mouth, enabling more enjoyable and participatory play.

== Autonomous behaviors ==
It has four different modes of behavior or moods: hunting, cautious, playful, and free-roam. In hunting mode, it will react to sharp sounds and progressively focus its attention more intensely on repeated sounds coming from the same direction. In cautious mode, it will react oppositely and move away from sounds it hears. In playful mode, it will react to sounds in a more whimsical fashion but neither approaching nor avoiding them. In free-roam mode, it will explore its own environment, avoiding obstacles and stopping occasionally to listen for loud sounds to investigate. The Roboraptor does not walk well on carpets and cannot be programmed.

== Flexible behaviors ==
When one touches one of Roboraptor's touch sensors, its reaction will vary depending on its mood. Touching its face when it is hunting will make it react angrily and most likely attempt to "attack" the person touching it. But if it is feeling playful, it will nuzzle the person's hand and then "attack", using its jaws.

== Laser targeting ==
Early versions of the Roboraptor could also follow a laser-like target pointed on the ground. This could be used this to lead it around a room under direct control. However, this feature was removed from later units.

== Mini Roboraptor ==
There is also a smaller version of Roboraptor available. However, it does not have a remote control or different modes of behavior. It is not an autonomous robot so much as it is a wind-up toy, though the smaller version does actually run on batteries. It is a smaller, cheaper, less functional Roboraptor. It walks at a single pace and it has a 'trigger' to make its mouth move, but it does not have any other sensors.
