= Aquapet =

Toy

AquaPets
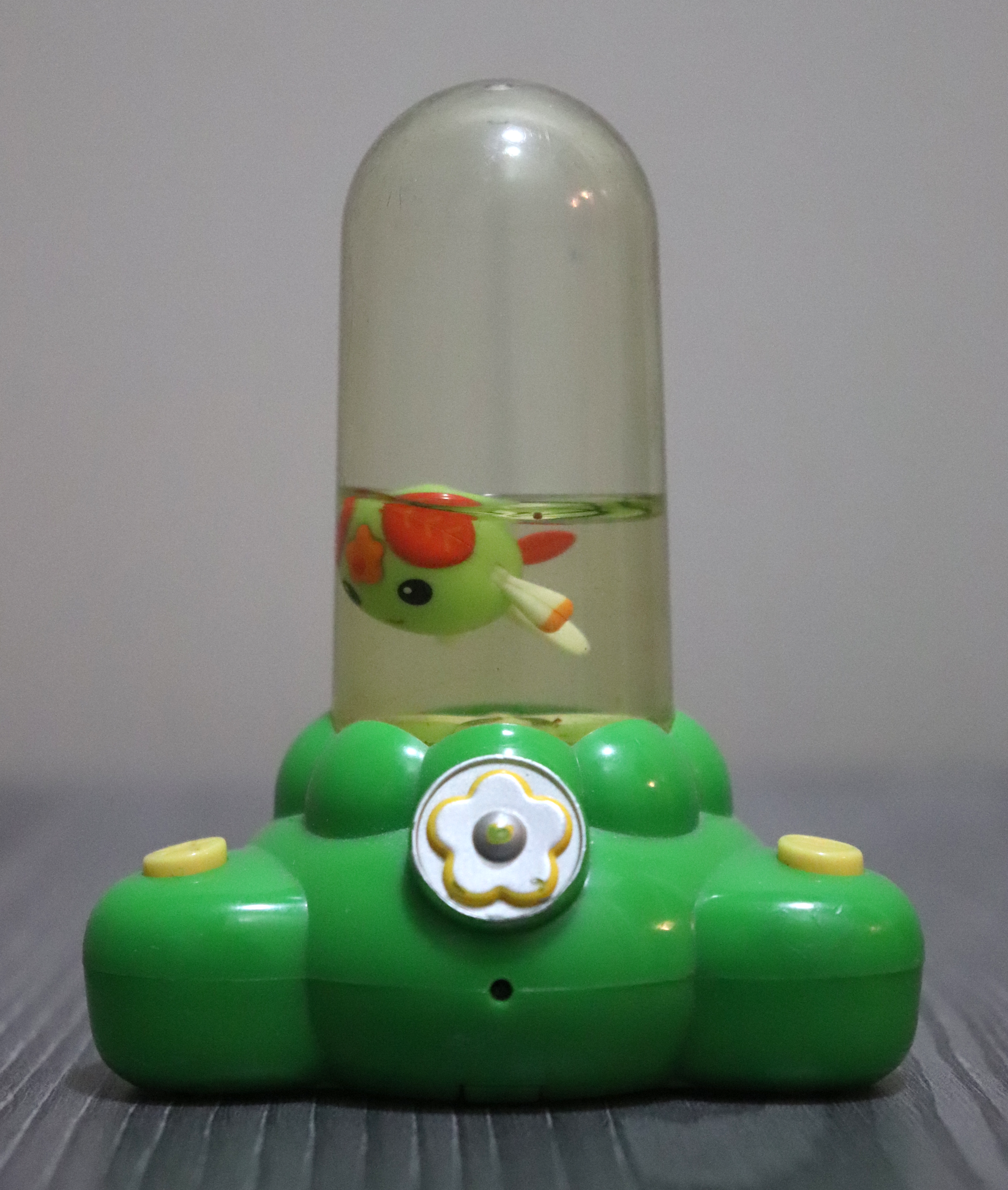
- "Tu" AquaPet in 2024
- Manufacturer: Wild Planet
- Released: February 2004

Aquapets are interactive electronic toys that were introduced in the US in 2004 by Wild Planet. They were originally created by Japanese company Sega Toys, under the name Puku Puku Angel (Japanese: ぷくぷくエンジェル).

They consist of a transparent, water-filled case housing a thumb-sized figure, and a base with a microchip, microphone, and speaker to register and respond to sounds made by kids or by other Aquapets. Each character has its own look, sounds and songs and responds with movement and melody. The more a child plays with their Aquapets, the more songs they will perform and the livelier they will become.

== History ==
The first three characters of the original Aquapets (Miku, also referred to as Kiko; Puku and Tu) were sold exclusively at Toys R Us stores starting in February 2004. By April of that year, the initial three figures were joined by three new characters (Kadet, Bunni and Stinga) to complete "Wave 1" which were available in mass and specialty stores across the country.

In October 2004, six new characters were released. "Wave 2" consisted of: Lugi, Fanga, Bebe, Pizzazz, Tabi and Blotto. In January 2005, "Wave 3" was released which included Floptopus, Snorkl, Squirt, Fuego, Likabee, and Peegee. "Wave 4" was released in August 2005, and it included Bertie, Purkle, Spangle, Dilly, Skinker, and Fizzie. "Wave 5" was the final "wave" of Aquapets. It was released in April 2006, and it included Pachinko, Harf, Zot, Zmooch, Fretta, and Kitzi.

In 2005, the spinoff LiquiFreaks were released. They work similar to Aquapets with two buttons, feed and zap. Another spinoff was released in 2006 called Dino-Mites, with a light in the tube that glows. They work similar to Aquapets and LiquiFreaks, but lack a microphone.

In March 2011, Wild Planet released New Aquapets - redesigned and reprogrammed versions of eight characters from previous collections, Bebe, Bertie, Bunni, Fizzie, Fretta, Harf, Puku and Squirt. New Aquapets live in tear-drop shaped cases and play three new interactive games: Memory Moov (a memory sequence game), Aqua Speed (a quick reflex challenge), and Bubble Boogie (a dancing game). In late 2011, "Wave 2" of the New Aquapets were released; consisting of Tu, Miku (renamed to Muki), Purkle, Likabee, Zmooch, and Kitzi.

== Reception ==
Aquapets were named one of the top Tech Toys of the year in the 2004 Toy Wishes magazine and were finalists in the same category on the nationally televised Ultimate Toy Awards show. They were featured in National Geographic Kids Magazine in "5 Smart Toys – the Science Behind This Season's Coolest Toys" in December, 2004, and covered twice in 2004 by U.S. News & World Report – once in a "Best New Toys" story, and once in "Smart Chart."

The Chicago Tribune recommended the toy as a stocking stuffer for parents to buy for their kids in the "Make sure your stocking has the right stuff" story in December, 2004. Disney Adventures Magazine called Aquapets "the perfect gift" and included the toy in its "All Wrapped Up" gift guide in December, 2004.

In 2004, they were featured on TV news programs across the country in "Top Toys" and "Holiday Gifts for Kids" segments, including: CNN Headline News, CBS News This Morning, CBS Early Show, CNBC Closing Bell, WB Morning News, NY1 News All Weekend, FOX Evening News, Tech TV Fresh Gear, Tech TV Screen Savers, CNBC Wake Up Call, NBC Evening News, NBC News Today, and Telemundo Ahora.

In 2005, Aquapets received the "Best Toy Award" Gold Seal from Oppenheim Toy Portfolio.

In the toy's later years, commentators pointed out that the base of the Aquapet toys resembles a phallic object.

== See also ==
- Virtual pet
