= WowWee =

Hong Kong-based toy company

WowWee Group Limited
- Type: Private
- Founded: 1988; 38 years ago Montreal, Quebec, Canada
- Founder: Richard Yanofsky; Peter Yanofsky
- Headquarters: Hong Kong, China,
- Website: www.wowwee.com

WowWee Group Limited is a privately held, Hong Kong–based Canadian consumer technology company.

== History ==
Initially from Canada, the two founding brothers (Richard and Peter Yanofsky) moved to Hong Kong to form the company in 1982, as an independent research & development and manufacturing outfit. As an OEM seller, they produced products such as the Power Rangers Power Gloves and the Talking Tots dolls. In 1987, the company changed focus, building and marketing toys under their own brand in response to a fall in OEM orders. In 1999, they produced new products including a robotic dog (MegaByte), T-Rex, and the Animaltronics and Dinotronics lines of remote control animals. In 1998 the company was purchased by Hasbro.

=== Under Hasbro ===
Shortly before the Hasbro sale, Peter Yanofsky reportedly caught physicist/roboticist Mark Tilden on the Discovery Channel, and soon hired him as a consultant. Initially Tilden worked part-time with WowWee while he continued his work with the Los Alamos National Laboratory, but in 2001, Tilden joined the company full-time. One of his first products with WowWee was the B.I.O. Bug, released in 2001. Unfortunately, while sales were doing well, they weren't as strong as either WowWee or Hasbro would have liked. In part this has been attributed to the after-effects of 9/11 and the anthrax attacks, while Tilden has also expressed disappointment with some of the limitations placed on the product design by Hasbro. After moving to WowWee full-time in 2001, Tilden focused his attention on developing Robosapien.

While Tilden was developing Robosapien, Hasbro canceled the project several times, leading Yanofsky to negotiate out of the contract in 2003. Robosapien was released in 2004, and over 1.5 million were reportedly sold in the first five months of sale. Robosapien was the first commercially available biomorphic robot, and the first to integrate personality-like features. Tilden continued to develop the line with the Robosapien V2 (released in 2005), which added functionality like speech capability; RS Media robot (released in 2006), which included user-created functions, and Roboreptile (also in 2006). The Roboquad a four-legged robot (released in 2007); the RS Tri-Bot, a three-wheeled robot (released in summer 2008),.

In 2007, working with inventor Sean Frawley, WowWee released the FlyTech Dragonfly – a remote control flying ornithopter. The Dragonfly was named as one of the inventions of the year by Time in 2007. The success of the Dragonfly led to other flying toys, such as the Bladestar (a remote controlled helicopter) and the Butterfly (a wind-up ornithopter aimed at younger children).

=== Under Optimal Group ===
On September 27, 2007, the publicly traded Optimal Group announced they had entered into a purchase agreement to acquire WowWee Ltd, which they completed in November of that year.

At the 2008 CES, several new products (including the Rovio and Femisapien) were announced with their estimated release dates and prices.

=== Private again; Fingerlings & Avastars ===
In 2010, the management of WowWee entered into a support agreement with Optimal Group, and took the company private again. In 2014, a new product, MiP, was released. It won more than 10 Tech and Toy awards, including the Toy Industry Associations’ 2015 TOTY award for Innovative Toy of the Year. MiP was also named "Innovative Toy of the Year" at the National Robotics Week. At the 2015 CES, WowWee announced products including MiPosaur and REV.

In 2017, the company employed about 100 people. For the 2017 Christmas season, it introduced, through a series of viral promotions on social media, a product called Fingerlings. The tiny robots, in the shape of monkeys, sloths and unicorns, became one of the most popular toys of the season. Some shoppers complained that they were sold fake Fingerlings on Amazon and Walmart's websites. In 2018, WowWee followed up the success with large interactive plush Fingerlings in the Fingerlings Hugs series.

In 2022, WowWee formed a partnership with the Roblox development group Gamefam to launch the Avastars line of dolls.

== 2010 lawsuit ==
On November 23, 2010, Engadget revealed that WowWee and a number of retailers were being sued for trademark infringement by Gibson Guitar Corporation for unlawfully using the shapes of the bodies and headstocks of Gibson's signature guitars in their Paper Jamz line of battery operated toy guitars. WowWee denied any wrongdoing and asserted that the shapes Gibson claimed as trademarks were generic and therefore could not function as trademarks. On November 24, 2010, the court denied Gibson's request for a temporary restraining order, but on December 22, 2010, granted Gibson's motion for a preliminary injunction. The case was later settled, with WowWee paying Gibson an undisclosed amount for licensing the likeness of Gibson guitars, according to Gibson CEO, Henry Juszkiewicz.

== 2022 lawsuit ==
On August 3, 2022, the video game company Roblox Corporation sued WowWee due to the Avastars line of toys. Roblox claimed that the Avastars' designs were too similar to that of a classic Roblox avatar.

== Shows and Movies ==
In the film CJ7, the robotic toy CJ1, is probably based on the design of Robopet.
