= Roboreptile =

Toy robot

The Roboreptile is a toy robot by WowWee. The Roboreptile has infrared and sound sensors, and is able to autonomously explore its environment while avoiding obstacles. It can also operate in different modes where it simulates behaviors of real animals. It is able to rear up on its hind legs and attack. Roboreptile was released in China on the 28 April 2006 and to the rest of the world later that year. It is superficially similar to a theropod or a prosauropod dinosaur but being quadrupedal it's better equated to a silesaurid or a monitor lizard.

== Features ==
- Biomorphic movements
- Four-legged walking and low speed running; bipedal "attack" mode; jumping action
- Flexible neck; whipping tail
- Multi-sensory environmental awareness
- Infrared vision sensors for obstacle avoidance and detection of movements
- Sonic sensors for detection of sharp, loud sounds
- Touch sensor for responding to human interaction
- Five modes

1. Autonomous (default): Hungry and aggressive; explores and interacts with his environment searching for prey; attacking, roaring, biting behaviors
2. Direct control: Multi-layered 28 function remote including demo function and volume control
3. Program: Enter a sequence of up to 20 commands
4. Guard: Activates vision and sonic sensor with realistic screeching
5. Sleep

- Three moods

1. Hungry: his "natural" (default) mood; activate the "feed" button on the remote and he will track down the signal
2. Satisfied: he calms down after eating
3. Hooded: he becomes subdued; depending upon human interaction, will either wake up hungry or fall asleep

- Auto shut-off function

== Robotyrannus ==
Despite its namesake, Robotyrannus is not a robotic version of a Tyrannosaurus. The Robotyrannus is a variation of the Roboreptile with some cosmetic differences: horns on its head and a dorsal fin. It is currently being sold in the UK, Canada and the United States (although in the US it is generically called Roboreptile, despite being the Robotyrannus design). Regardless of the altered appearance, Robotyrannus is functionally identical to the original Roboreptile. It has been a RadioShack exclusive in United States, but the title was RoboReptile.
