= SNS =

SNS, sns, or SNs may refer to:

== Science and technology ==
=== Biology and medicine ===
- Somatic nervous system or voluntary nervous system
- Supplemental nursing system, a system designed to supplement breastfeeding
- Sympathetic nervous system, a part of the autonomic nervous system

=== Computing ===
- Social network, a social structure made up of a set of social actors
  - Social networking service, an online platform used to build relations
- Amazon Simple Notification Service, a cloud-based service
- Synthetic nervous system, a computational neuroscience model

=== Other uses in science and technology ===
- Spallation Neutron Source, Oak Ridge, Tennessee, United States
- U.S. Strategic National Stockpile of medical supplies
- Tin(II) sulfide, SnS

== Organizations ==
=== Businesses ===
- SNS Bank, Netherlands
- Street News Service, for street newspapers

=== Political parties ===
- Serbian Progressive Party (Srpska napredna stranka)
- Serb People's Party (Montenegro) (Srpska narodna stranka)
- Slovak National Party (Slovenská národná strana) (1990–present)
- Slovak National Party (historical) (Slovenská národná strana) (1871–1938)
- Slovenian National Party (Slovenska nacionalna stranka)

=== Other organizations ===
- Scuola Normale Superiore, an Italian higher education institution
- Serviço Nacional de Saúde, the Portuguese national health service
- Sistema Nacional de Salud, the national health system of Spain
- Société de natation de Strasbourg, a French water polo team
- Special Night Squads, a former Jewish-British military unit
- Stoke Newington School, London, United Kingdom
- Finland–Soviet Union Peace and Friendship Society (Suomen–Neuvostoliiton rauhan ja ystävyyden seura), a Finnish anti-war propaganda organization

== Transport ==
- Salinas Municipal Airport, Monterey County, California, United States (IATA code)
- Staines railway station, Surrey, England (National Rail station code)

== Other uses ==
- SNS, the product code used by Nintendo for Super NES hardware (e.g. SNS-001)
- Salomon Nordic System, a binding standard for cross country skis
- Saturday Night Special (disambiguation)
- Nahavaq language, an ISO 639-3 code
