= Sociorobotics =

Sociorobotics is a field of research studying the implications, complexities and subsequent design of artificial social, spatial, cultural and haptic behaviours, protocols and interactions of robots with each other and with humans in equal measure. Intrinsically taking into account the structured and unstructured spaces of habitation, including industrial, commercial, healthcare, eldercare and domestic environments. This emergent perspective to robotic research encompasses and surpasses the conventions of Social robotics and Artificial society/social systems research. Which do not appear to acknowledge that numerous robots (humanoid and non-humanoid) and humans are increasingly inhabiting the same spaces which require similar performances and agency of social behaviour, particularly regarding the commercial emergence of workplace, personal and companion robotics.

== Approach ==
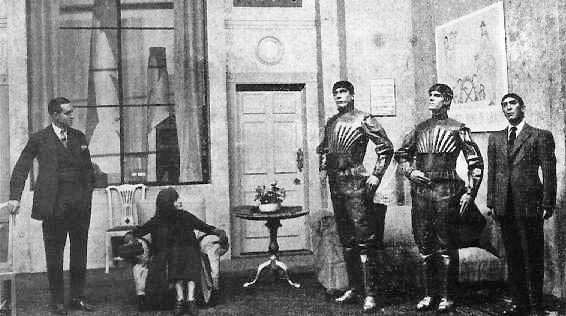
Capek play

Robots in the near future will be required to behave socially and spatially intelligent in all contexts of artificial social interaction, recognising sophisticated cues from both humans and other robots alike, similar in some respects to the required social awareness and generally expected social behaviour of our animal companions. Furthermore, sociorobotics as a research platform also fully accepts that robots can be modular hardware, controlled by pre-programmed disembodied software agency (ubiquitous digital characters) or even 'Wizard of Oz' style teleoperation requiring the same social intelligence, awareness and protocols. Sociorobotics attempts to go further by observing and incorporating the aesthetic assemblages and intricacies of social, spatial, cultural & haptic complexities to study the creation of artificial social behaviours and the subsequent protocol design considerations for contemporary and future robotics. Sociorobotics also recognises the critical interdisciplinarity of contemporary and future robot design; acquiring theoretical foundations and research methodologies from HRI, Human Geography, Interaction Design, Actor-network theory and Social Psychology. These foundations bring together intimate concepts of space, haptics and social/cultural criteria of heterogeneous human-robot interactions (i.e. Real Dolls, Lars and the Real Girl), engendering a more comprehensive and cognizant research approach to successful robot design.

== Enabling technologies ==
=== Artificial intelligence and machine learning ===
Advances in artificial intelligence and machine learning underpin many social robot capabilities, including vision, speech understanding and affect recognition. Commonly used tools include pose estimation frameworks, word embedding models for dialogue and deep neural networks for gesture generation and behaviour modelling.

=== Manufacturing and 3D printing ===
Additive manufacturing has made it easier to prototype and customize robot bodies and expressive heads. The open-source InMoov humanoid platform demonstrates how affordable materials and desktop 3D printers can be used to build social robots. Design studies have examined how to refine robot heads based on feedback from both experts and novice users.

=== Processing hardware and software frameworks ===
Modern social robots typically use embedded processors comparable to general-purpose computers, sometimes supported by graphics processing units for deep learning tasks. Software frameworks such as the Robot Operating System (ROS) and manufacturer-specific middleware like NAOqi provide modular architectures for integrating perception, cognition, navigation and expressive behaviour. Dedicated frameworks for human–robot interaction define standard interfaces for skeleton tracking, affect sensing, and natural language processing.

== Concepts and frameworks ==
=== Human–robot interaction frameworks ===
Sociorobotics builds on concepts from Human–robot interaction (HRI), including work that describes different perspectives on how humans and robots relate to each other. Kerstin Dautenhahn proposes a conceptual space for HRI that distinguishes three overlapping perspectives: robot-centred HRI, which treats the robot as an autonomous creature with its own drives and goals; human-centred HRI, which focuses on how people perceive and experience robot behaviour; and robot-cognition-centred HRI, which emphasises internal architectures for planning, learning and decision-making. She argues that socially capable robots usually require an integration of all three perspectives rather than isolated, discipline-specific designs.

=== Human–robot relationships ===
Dautenhahn also distinguishes between a "caretaker" paradigm, in which humans are expected to care for a robot viewed as a dependent creature, and an "assistant" or "companion" paradigm, in which robots primarily act as helpers that adapt to human needs and preferences. She raises ethical and cognitive concerns about expecting people, especially vulnerable users, to invest emotional resources in machines that seek friendship or attachment, arguing that companion robots should focus on usefulness, reliability and socially appropriate behaviour rather than replacing human relationships.

=== Socially interactive robots ===
In related work on social robotics, Terrence Fong, Illah Nourbakhsh and Dautenhahn use the term "socially interactive robots" for robots in which social interaction with humans is a central feature, rather than a secondary interface for teleoperation or control. They list common characteristics such as the ability to express or perceive emotions, communicate with high-level dialogue, recognise and model other agents, maintain social relationships, use natural social cues (for example gaze and gesture), display a distinctive personality, and develop social competencies over time. These definitions are often used as a reference point when describing robots and systems studied within sociorobotics.

== Research methods ==
Sociorobotics overlaps with broader HRI research and often relies on empirical methods to study how people perceive and respond to robots in shared social, domestic and clinical environments. A recurring theme in HRI has been the need for standardised measurement tools so that results about user attitudes and experiences can be compared across different studies and robot platforms.

One influential contribution in this area is the Godspeed Questionnaire Series, developed by Christoph Bartneck and colleagues and first published in the International Journal of Social Robotics in 2009.The series consists of five short questionnaires that use semantic differential rating scales to measure users' perceptions of a robot's anthropomorphism, animacy, likeability, perceived intelligence, and perceived safety. The authors report acceptable internal consistency for each of these dimensions across multiple user studies and propose the scales as practical tools for robot developers to monitor changes in user perception as designs evolve.

Subsequent work has identified the Godspeed questionnaires as one of the most widely used self-report instruments in HRI and human–agent interaction, noting that they have been translated into many languages and adopted in a variety of social-robot studies. For example, adaptations of the scales have been used to assess older adults' perceptions of humanoid and assistive robots in eldercare contexts, including attitudes toward likeability, perceived intelligence and perceived safety after direct interaction with a robot. Within sociorobotics, such standardised questionnaires are often combined with observational, physiological and qualitative methods to analyse how robots are experienced as social actors in shared spaces and to inform the design of social, spatial and cultural interaction protocols.

== Expressive behaviour and social learning ==
Research in social robotics has emphasised that expressive behaviour is central to enabling robots to learn from and collaborate with people. Breazeal et al. argue that social robots benefit from expressive channels such as gaze, facial expressions, body posture, gesture, prosody and proxemics when engaging in teaching–learning interactions with non-expert users. These cues help robots coordinate turn-taking, signal uncertainty, indicate attention and regulate the tempo and complexity of interaction, which can make it easier for humans to adapt their teaching strategies. Some work contrasts machine-centred approaches, in which humans mainly provide labelled data or reward signals, with human-centred approaches that treat teaching and learning as a joint, collaborative activity. In the latter view, human teachers interpret a robot’s expressive behaviour as indicating internal state, progress or confusion, and adjust their demonstrations accordingly, for example by slowing down, repeating steps or restructuring the task.

Studies on shared attention, gaze following, pointing and spatial scaffolding show that humans often use social and spatial strategies to highlight relevant aspects of a scene, such as moving objects closer, grouping important items together or using eye gaze and gesture to direct attention. Robotic architectures that treat these cues as “social filters” can reduce the perceptual search space and improve learning in cluttered environments. Some sociorobotic systems also incorporate perspective taking by modelling the viewpoint, beliefs or goals of a human partner in order to interpret ambiguous demonstrations or instructions. This connects work on social learning in robots with broader research on theory of mind, mental state attribution and joint intention formation in human–robot interaction.

Notable experimental platforms in this line of work include the robots Kismet, Leonardo and Nexi, which were designed as highly expressive social robots to study face-to-face interaction, social learning and teamwork between humans and robots.

== Open issues and ethical questions ==
Review articles highlight several open questions for social robotics. One recurring debate concerns the minimal criteria for a robot to count as "social" and how to distinguish social robots from conventional systems with sophisticated user interfaces or telepresence platforms. The field of roboethics treats such questions within applied ethics for robotics, focusing on human responsibilities, social impacts, and the distribution of risks and benefits when robots operate in everyday environments.

Social robots often collect continuous streams of audio, video, and physiological data, which raises concerns about surveillance, data protection, and informed consent, especially in private spaces such as homes, hospitals, and care institutions. Empirical studies report that users may worry about who controls the data gathered by robots, how long it is stored, and whether it might be used for profiling or targeted advertising.

Care and assistive applications highlight further ethical issues. Care-ethics approaches argue that robots used in health and eldercare should be designed to support, rather than replace, relationships of trust, attentiveness, and responsibility between human caregivers and patients. Critics also suggest that "robot nannies" or companions for children and older adults may encourage emotional attachment to machines, enable cost-cutting or staffing reductions, or lead to deception if users are led to overestimate a robot's understanding and agency.

Authors more generally point to the need for transparent design processes, interdisciplinary oversight, and public engagement when deploying social robots in sensitive domains. Proposed guidelines include involving stakeholders in design, stating clearly when interactions are recorded or mediated by AI, and ensuring that responsibility for malfunction or harm remains traceable to human organisations rather than to robots themselves.

== See also ==
- Bruno Latour
- Social Robots
- Artificial society
- Human geography
- Cultural geography
- Social Psychology
- Interaction Design
- Human Robot Interaction
- Actor-network theory
