= Cyberflora =

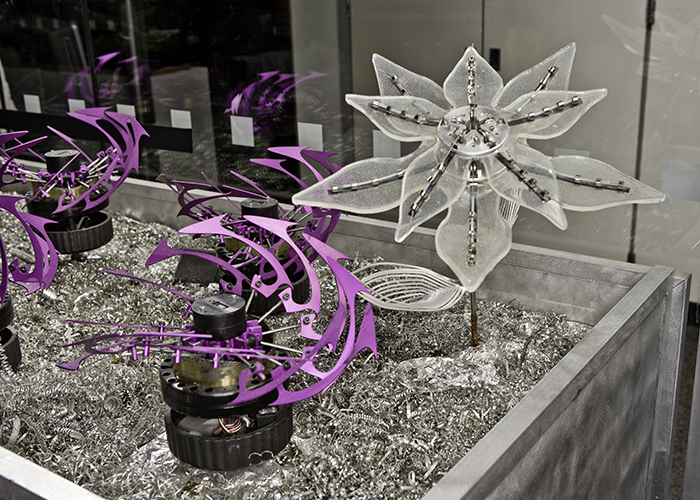
Cyberflora at MIT Media Lab in 2008

The Cyberflora project is a project developed by the Media Lab at Massachusetts Institute of Technology. The project is part of the Anima Machina program at MIT - a program that was developed by Assistant Professor of Media Arts and Sciences and Director of the Robotic Life Group Cynthia Breazeal. The Cyberflora project allowed Breazeal and students involved in the media lab to investigate emotional intelligence in a breed of robots that combines both plant and animal characteristics.

== The Garden ==
Breazeal's mechanical flower garden is composed of four "species" of robotic flora. Each species is an amalgamation of animal-like conduct and flower-like attributes that is put into a robotic representation that is fully aware of its surrounding environment and can respond to stimuli in a "life-like and distinct manner." Electromechanical systems hidden within the flowers' shells "allow petals to open and close and tentacles to reach or retreat in response to human movement." Soft music, varied throughout the exhibit, is played in the background as people interact with flora.

The flowers in the garden use technologies such as capacitive sensing and thermal sensors to react to human hands and bodies elsewhere in the room.

== Design team ==
- Cynthia Breazeal - Project lead
- Jeff Lieberman - Design lead
- Ryan Kavanaugh - Graphic design
- Heather Knight - Undergraduate
- Blake Brasher - Undergraduate
- Dan McAnulty - Undergraduate

== Exhibits ==
Cyberflora was debuted in April 2003 at the National Design Triennial which was hosted by the Cooper-Hewitt, National Design Museum in New York City, New York. The exhibit began on April 22, 2003, and ended on January 25, 2004.
