= Cynthia Breazeal =

American computer scientist

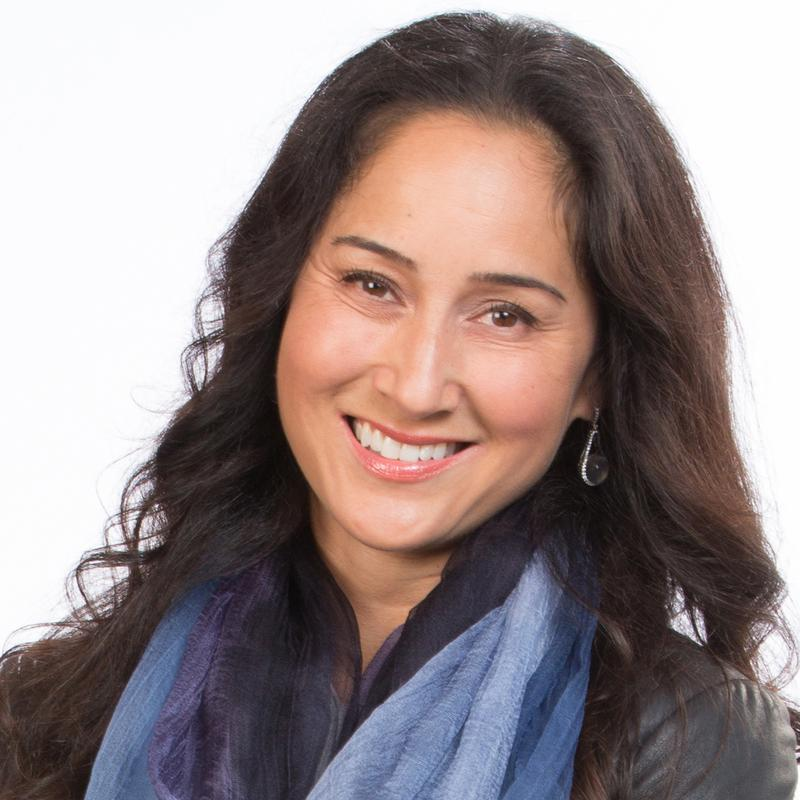
- Born: November 15, 1967 (age 58); Albuquerque, New Mexico, US
- Education: University of California, Santa Barbara (B.S., EECS, 1989); MIT (S.M., 1993; Sc.D., 2000)
- Known for: Robotics, Jibo, and K-12 AI literacy
- Scientific career
- Fields: Computer science, robotics
- Doctoral advisor: Rodney Brooks

Cynthia Breazeal is an American AI and robotics scientist and entrepreneur. She is a pioneer of social robotics and human-robot interaction. She is the former chief scientist and chief experience officer of Jibo, a company she co-founded in 2012 that developed companion robots for the family at home. Currently, she is a professor of media arts and sciences at the Massachusetts Institute of Technology, where she is the director of the Personal Robots Group at the MIT Media Lab, dean for digital learning at MIT Open Learning, and director of the MIT RAISE Initiative. Her work has explored the theme of living everyday life in the presence of AI and, in recent years, has been a leader in AI literacy for youth.

== Early life and education ==
As the daughter of two computer scientists working in national labs, she had early access to the fields of computer science and engineering. Breazeal earned a B.Sc in electrical and computer engineering from the University of California, Santa Barbara, in 1989. From MIT she received her M.S. in 1993 and Sc.D. in 2000, both in electrical engineering and computer science. After watching NASA land a robot on Mars in 1997, she wondered why robots had made it to Mars but not into everyday lives. This inspired her to switch her focus to build the world's first social robot, Kismet, and pioneer the field of social robotics.

Breazeal developed the robot Kismet as a doctoral thesis under Rodney Brooks. Kismet explored the expressive social-emotional exchange between humans and autonomous robots, including when they collaborate as partners. Kismet, as well as other robots Breazeal co-developed while a graduate student at the MIT Computer Science and Artificial Intelligence Lab, has been on display in the MIT Museum since 2000.

== MIT career ==
Breazeal is a professor of Media Arts and Sciences at MIT, where she founded and directs the Personal Robots Group. She has written several books in the field of AI robotics and has published hundreds of highly-cited peer-reviewed papers on the topic. She also serves on multiple editorial boards and committees for autonomous robots. Breazeal's work at MIT has examined social embodiment in robots that interact with people using natural verbal, paralinguistic, and non-verbal cues such as gaze, emotions, and posture on human emotional engagement. She did early explorations of social embodiment on robotic telepresence and has investigated long-term interaction with robots, such as the impact of rapport-building on human outcomes in domains like health, wellness, and education. In sum Breazeal has centered her work around the concept of "living with AI," the impact of incorporating social robots into our everyday lives. Her goal, she has said, is to help people in achieving long-term goals in areas where sustained social support is known to be key for human outcomes, such as behavior change, coaching, and tutoring.

With professors Eric Klopfer and Hal Abelson, in 2021 she launched the MIT RAISE Initiative to investigate and drive AI's the creative potential and ethical use, particularly in the context of K-12 education.

In January 2022, Breazeal was named as dean for digital learning at MIT, where she leads MIT Open Learning's revenue-generating professional education and research portfolio, identifying the areas for technical and pedagogical innovation, while researching how different methods and technologies can improve digital learning.

=== Social robots and the Personal Robots Group ===
==== Early robots ====
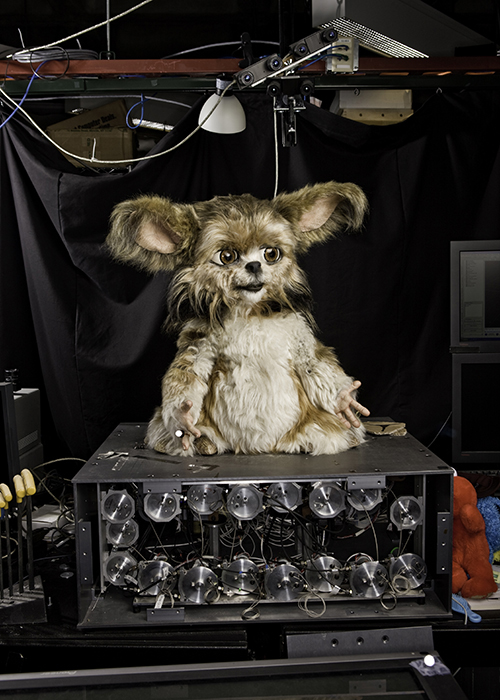
Leonardo in 2008

Leonardo was one of Breazeal's earliest robots, co-developed with Stan Winston Studio and a successor to Kismet (recognized in 2006 by Wired magazine as one of the "50 Best Robots Ever"). Leonardo was also used to investigate social cognition and theory of mind abilities on robots with application to human-robot collaboration, in addition to developing social learning abilities for robots such as imitation, tutelage, and social referencing. Nexi was another of Breazeal's robots in this tradition and was named by Time magazine as one of the 50 Best Inventions of 2008. Nexi is an MDS (mobile, dexterous, social) robot that combines social communication abilities with mobile dexterity to investigate more complex forms of human-robot teaming.

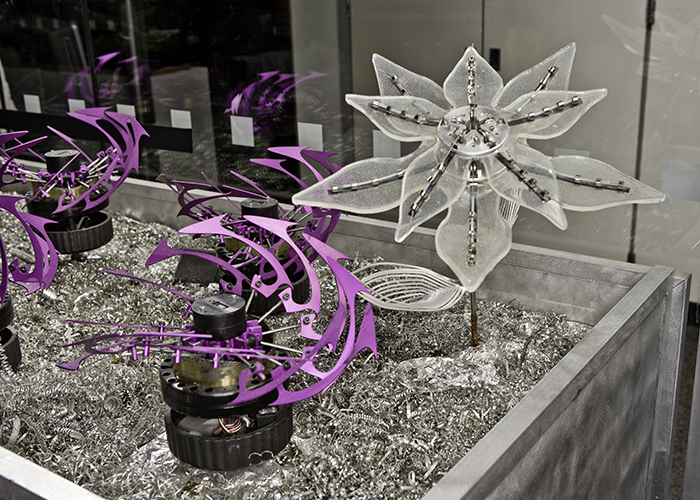
Cyberflora at MIT Media Lab in 2008

Breazeal has also been part of creating a robotic flower garden installation, Cyberflora, which was exhibited at the 2003 National Design Triennial at the Smithsonian Cooper-Hewitt National Design Museum.

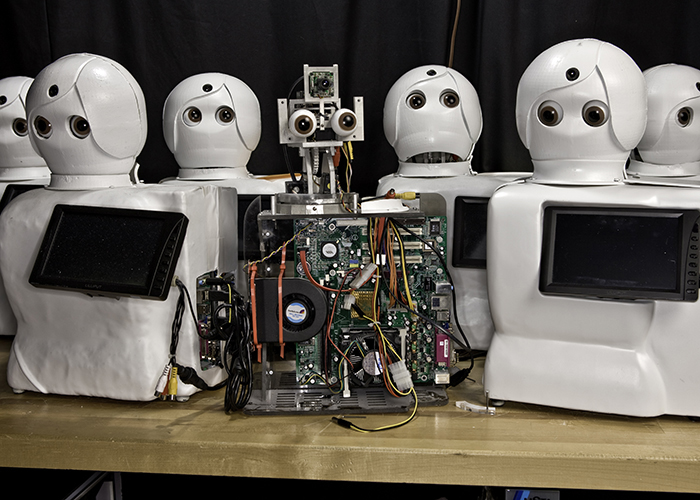
Autom at MIT Media Lab in 2008

Breazeal's Personal Robots Group at the MIT Media Lab has produced a number of real-world robot design projects and publications covering topics such as education, health and wellness, aging, psychology, personalization, and advancing the social and emotional intelligence of AI and robots. Autom was a robot diet and exercise coach developed by Breazeal's Ph.D. student Cory Kidd; research found Autom to be more effective than a computer counterpart in sustaining engagement and building trust and a working alliance with users. Breazeal's group has also explored expressive remote presence robots such as MeBot, whose physical social embodiment was found to elicit greater psychological involvement, engagement, and desire to cooperate over purely screen-based video conferencing or a mobile screen. There is also the Huggable, which was designed as a pediatric companion to help support the emotional needs of hospitalized children and to help support and augment child life specialists. The Tega robot was developed as a personalized learning companion for young children for early childhood language and literacy development. Instead of engaging children as a tutor, the robot played educational games as a peer-like companion. Tega has been used in numerous studies with children to show its adaptive personalization of content along with its social and emotional support during peer-like interactions. Tega helps with improved language and literacy skills, but it can also foster children's increased growth mindset, curiosity, and creativity.

=== AI and education ===
In recent years Breazeal's work has expanded into AI and education. Through MIT's Responsible AI for Social Empowerment and Education initiative, she has been a global leader of K12 AI literacy for all children. She has emphasized RAISE's ambition to innovate and advance at scale, to educate primary through high school-aged students in the creative and ethical use of AI, and do so in part with free resources for use in the classroom and teacher professional development. MIT RAISE pursues a constructionist pedagogical approach called computational action that fosters critical thinking, teamwork, and creative problem solving and expression. As part of that approach, in 2021 MIT RAISE created the MIT FutureMakers program, "a free, six-week summer program that inspires and trains high school and early college students how to design with AI and digital technologies to be positive change makers in their communities."

The same year, MIT RAISE launched Day of AI to advance, at scale, the mission that "AI literacy is for everyone". Day of AI was launched in collaboration with i2 Learning president Ethan Berman, and through it RAISE has developed innovative, free, and open AI curricula, AI-powered tools to support learning-by-making, and professional development for K-12. To date, tens of thousands of teachers and over a million students have learned AI literacy in 50 U.S. states and 170 countries. RAISE has received significant funding from Google and DP World, among others.

As MIT broadly has taken on a more prominent role in AI policy, Breazeal co-authored papers on AI's risks and rewards for career pathways in secondary education and, for a government audience, a brief on the "proper use of AI in education".

=== Research impact ===
Breazeal's research publications have over 40,000 citations on Google Scholar and an h-index of 100, having authored or co-authored more than 100 publications, each cited more than 100 times. (A typical h-index for a computer science senior scholar is generally between 30 and 60.) Breazeal's most influential publications are her early ones that pioneered social robots. Publications co-authored with her graduate students have become sources for large-language models in health, K-12 AI literacy, AI and ethics, social robot learning companions for children, and long-term human-robot interaction studies.

== Industry work ==
=== Jibo, Inc. ===
On July 16, 2014, Breazeal launched a successful Indiegogo campaign to crowdfund the development of Jibo, a personal assistant robot widely marketed as the world's first family robot. She served as chief scientist and chief experience officer. Jibo reached its series A fundraising goal of $70 million. Its natural social interface was the first consumer product to combine far-field speech and machine vision to identify people and their movement with physically expressive behavior, the ability to turn to look at the user, and an appealing persona. Inspired by the app ecosystem of mobile devices, Jibo was also the first personal robot to use these capabilities to perform a range of skills.

Jibo was released in November 2017. The robot was created to be a helpful companion that could bring "content to life" in a new way beyond flat screens. Jibo was designed to interact with people with more engaging social experiences, including storytelling, game play, and other forms of entertainment. It also supported a range of practical skills that leveraged machine vision such as being an interactive photographer, recognizing people to deliver news and weather in a personalized report, IoT control with an IFTTT integration, music with iHeartRadio, and other features.

Jibo generally received positive reviews for its innovative user experience and likable persona; however, it offered fewer skills than Amazon Alexa and Google Home, which came at a lower price point. The company failed to raise series B funding, and in March 2020, the assets of Jibo Inc. were acquired by NTT Corporation for healthcare and education markets.

Breazeal returned to the MIT Media Lab in 2018 and used the Jibo platform to continue to advance new AI capabilities and -- more recently using new LLM generative AI models -- to support long-term interactions with people and robots in real-world environments to understand what properties of social robots and personified AI agents lead to beneficial outcomes for people. Her Personal Robots Group investigated the impact of social embodiment on human engagement and perceptions of AI personas and found richer forms of social embodiment led to more extended interaction and stronger perceptions of trustworthiness, emotional connection, and companionship.

Since 2018, her research group has published numerous studies using Jibo in the home, senior communities, and schools. Breazeal has shown that the role of the robot as a collaborative, emotionally engaging partner can enhance children's creative story-making, enrich parent-child interactions around educational stories and games, serve as a positive psychology coach to improve mental wellness even during the COVID-19 pandemic, and act as a social catalyst to promote social interaction among residents in senior communities. Several of her publications highlight the role of Jibo's companionship and physical presence in promoting more successful, longer-lasting outcomes for people.

== Awards and recognition ==
- Breazeal served as a consultant on the 2001 Spielberg-Kubric movie A.I. Artificial Intelligence. She also has a prominent role as a virtual participant in a popular exhibit on robots with the traveling exhibit, Star Wars: Where Science Meets Imagination, interacting with a real C-3PO (voiced by Anthony Daniels) as she spoke to the audience through a pre-recorded message displayed on a large plasma flat-screen display.
- Named in 2003 by the MITTechnology Review TR100 as one of the top 100 innovators in the world under the age of thirty-five.
- 2003 finalist for the National Design Award in Communication.
- Received the 2008 Gilbreth Lectures Award by the National Academy of Engineering .
- Nexi robot named one of Time magazine's Best Inventions of 2008.
- In 2014, recognized as an entrepreneur as Fortune magazine's Most Promising Women Entrepreneurs
- 2014 recipient of the L'Oreal USA Women in Digital NEXT Generation Award.
- Received the 2014 George R. Stibitz Computer & Communications Pioneer Award for seminal contributions to the development of Social Robotics and Human Robot Interaction.
- Named in 2015 by Entrepreneur magazine as one of the Women to Watch.
- Jibo named a 2025 winner of the Core77 Design Awards in the consumer products category.
- Jibo featured on the cover of Time magazine's 25 Best Inventions of 2017.
- In 2020, elected a AAAI Fellow by the Association for the Advancement of Artificial Intelligence.
- Forbes 2023 50 Over 50.
- Recipient of the 2024 $50K Robotics Medal for Pioneering Women in Robotics by MassRobotics.
- Announced as a 2024 fellow to the American Association for the Advancement of Science.
- Named an IEEE Senior Member in 2025.

== Selected works ==
=== Books ===
- Breazeal, Cynthia (2002). Designing Sociable Robots. The MIT Press. ISBN 0-262-02510-8.
- Breazeal, Cynthia; Bar-Cohen, Yoseph (2003). Biologically Inspired Intelligent Robots. Bellingham, Washington: SPIE (The International Society for Optical Engineering). ISBN 0-8194-4872-9.

=== Selected Articles, Papers, and Chapters ===
- Brooks, Rodney A.; Breazeal, Cynthia; Marjanović, Matthew; Scassellati, Brian; Williamson, Matthew M. (1999). Nehaniv, Chrystopher L. (ed.). "The Cog Project: Building a Humanoid Robot". Computation for Metaphors, Analogy, and Agents. Berlin, Heidelberg: Springer: 52–87. doi:10.1007/3-540-48834-0_5. ISBN 978-3-540-48834-7.
- Breazeal, Cynthia (2003). "Emotion and sociable humanoid robots". International Journal of Human-computer Studies. 59 (1–2): 119–155. doi:10.1016/S1071-5819(03)00018-1.
- Breazeal, Cynthia (2003). "Toward sociable robots". Robotics and Autonomous Systems. 42 (3–4): 167–175. doi:10.1016/S0921-8890(02)00373-1.
- Rahwan, Iyad; Cebrian, Manuel; Obradovich, Nick; Bongard, Josh; Bonnefon, Jean-François; Breazeal, Cynthia; Crandall, Jacob W.; Christakis, Nicholas A.; Couzin, Iain D.; Jackson, Matthew O.; Jennings, Nicholas R.; Kamar, Ece; Kloumann, Isabel M.; Larochelle, Hugo; Lazer, David (2019-04). "Machine behaviour". Nature. 568 (7753): 477–486.
- Breazeal, Cynthia; Rai, Arun; Ramesh, Balasubramaniam; Chen, Liwei; Long, Yuan; Aria, Andrea; Loi, Hao; Torralba, Antonio; Bernstein, Jeremy; Reich, Justin; Klopfer, Eric; Abelson, Hal; Westerman, George; Bosch, Christina (2024-03-27). "Opportunities, Issues, and Challenges for Generative AI in Fostering Equitable Pathways in Computing Education". An MIT Exploration of Generative AI.
- Klopfer, Eric, Justin Reich, Hal Abelson, and Cynthia Breazeal. 2024. "Generative AI and K-12 Education: An MIT Perspective." An MIT Exploration of Generative AI.
- DiPaola, Daniella; Salazar-Gómez, Andrés F.; Abelson, Hal; Klopfer, Eric; Goldston, David; Breazeal, Cynthia (2024). "How Policy Can Help Ensure the Proper Use of AI in K-12 Education" (PDF). MIT AI Policy Brief: K12 Education.
- Chen, Huili; Kim, Yubin; Patterson, Kejia; Breazeal, Cynthia; Park, Hae Won (2025-03-12). "Social robots as conversational catalysts: Enhancing long-term human-human interaction at home". Science Robotics. 10 (100): eadk3307. doi:10.1126/scirobotics.adk3307.
