= Supplemental nursing system =

System designed to supplement breastfeeding

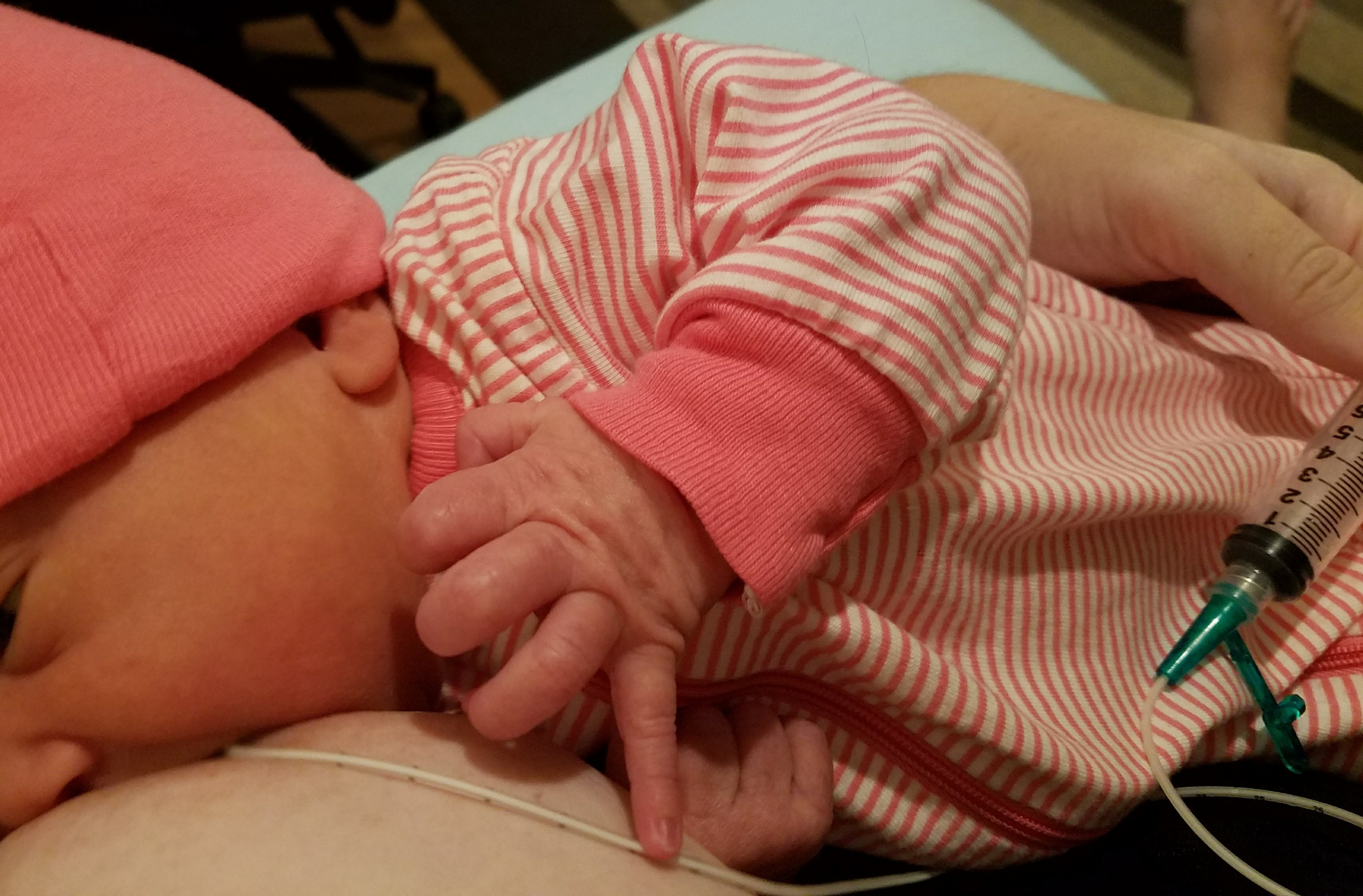
4-day-old infant latched and nursing with supplemental nursing system

Video showing how a supplemental nursing system is used

A supplemental nursing system (SNS), also known as a lactation aid, is a device that consists of a container and a capillary tube. It is used to provide additional nutrients to a baby whose mother has low milk supply. During breastfeeding, the end of the tube is placed alongside the mother's nipple so that both the tube and the breast are in the infant's mouth.

The SNS container can be filled with pumped breastmilk, donor milk, or with infant formula.

The tubing is usually attached with removable tape. When the newborn infant suckles on the breast, the infant is nourished both by fluid from the capillary tube and by the mother's breastmilk from the nipple. The mother's milk supply is stimulated by the infant suckling, and in most cases the use of the SNS can be discontinued in a few days or weeks when the mother's milk supply has risen to meet the infant's needs. Mothers usually obtain SNS supplies from a lactation consultant.

== Images ==
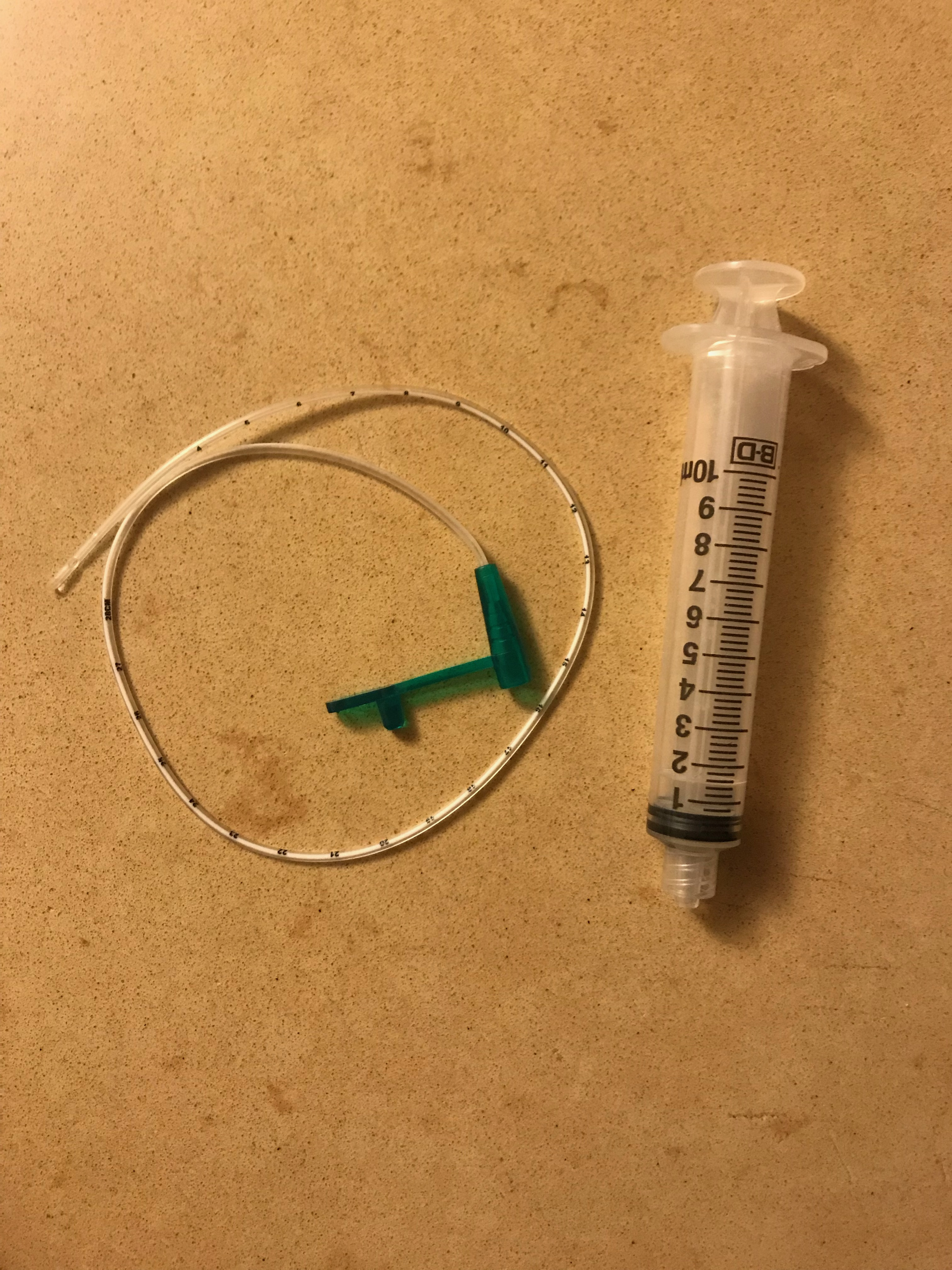
Equipment for supplemental nursing system using syringe

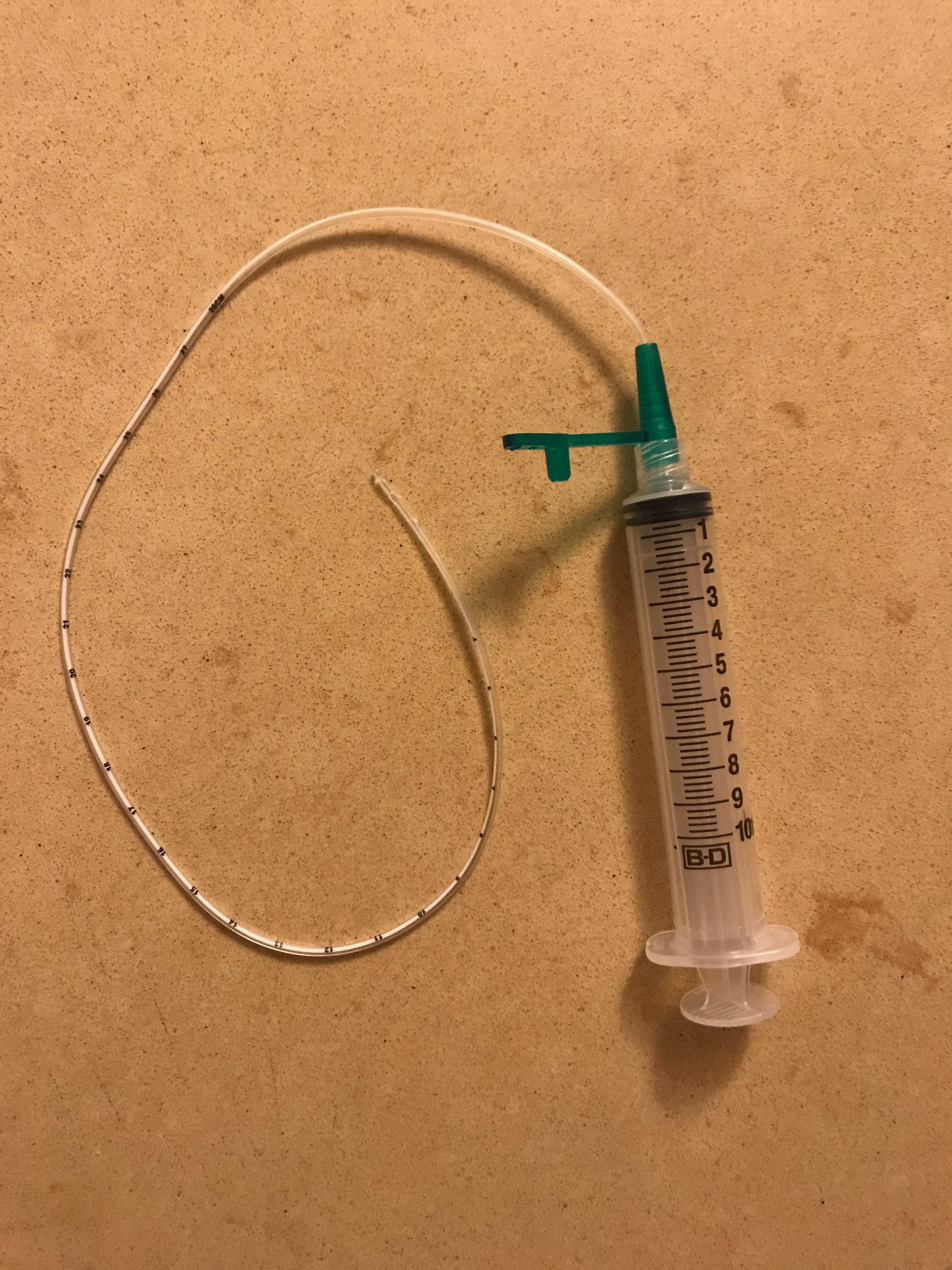
Equipment for supplemental nursing system using syringe, assembled

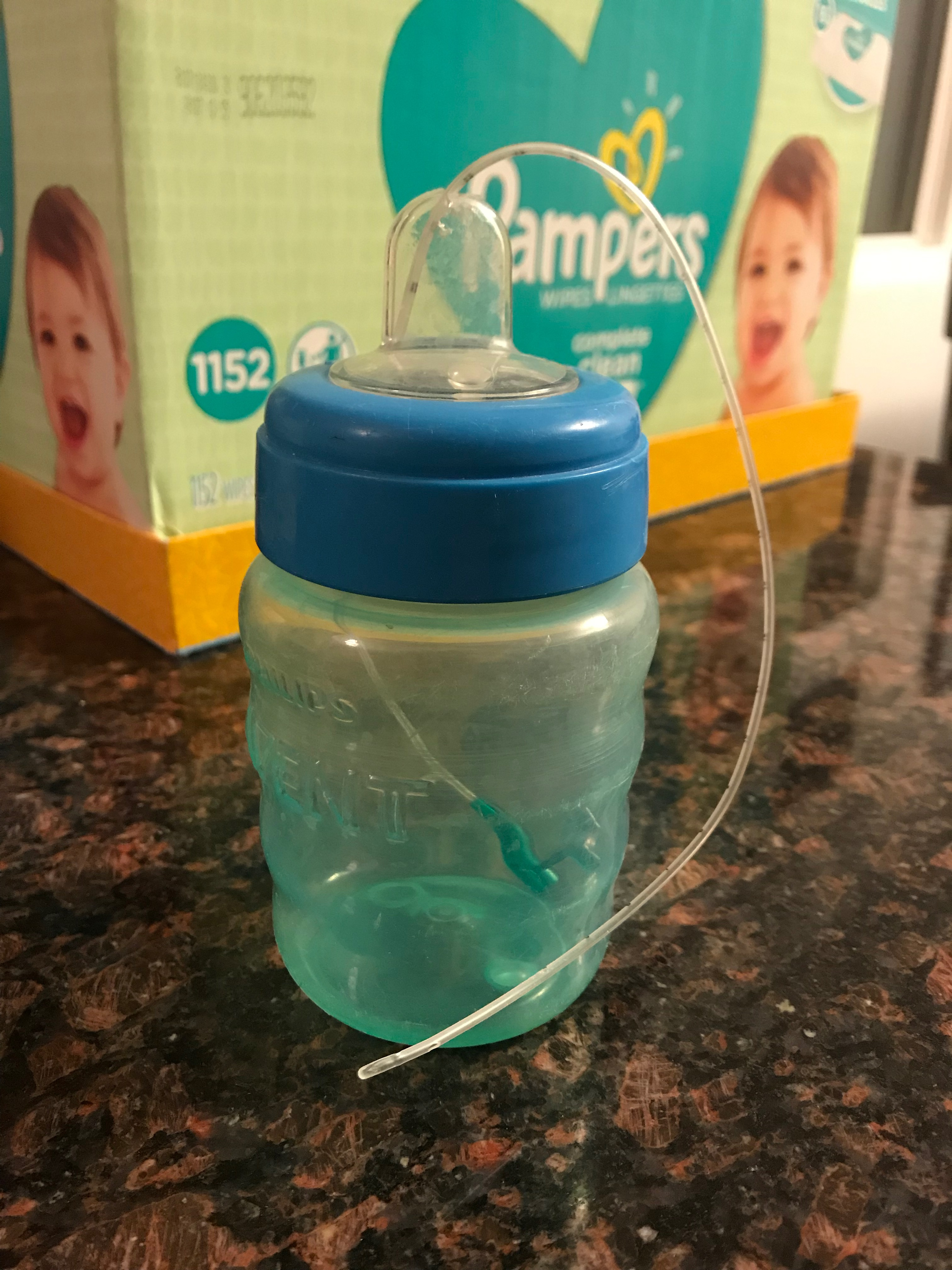
Equipment for supplemental nursing system using a bottle. The opening of the teat has been enlarged.

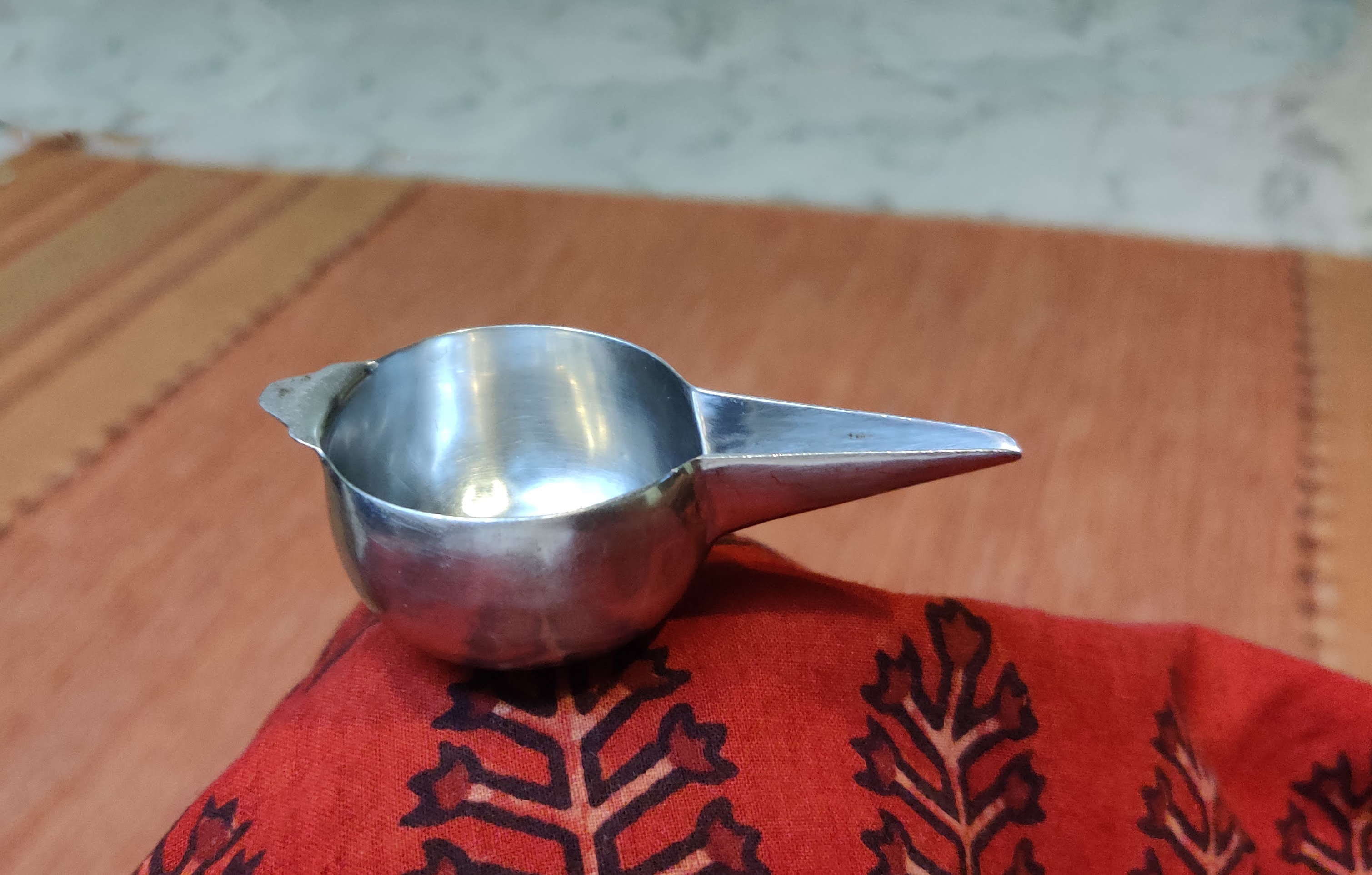
Paladai is now used in prominent hospitals in India for premature babies, for supplemental feeding.
