= Saturday Night Special =

Saturday Night Special may refer to:

- Saturday night special, an inexpensive handgun
- Saturday Night Special (TV series), a 1996 television show on Fox
- "Saturday Night Special" (Lynyrd Skynyrd song), 1975
- "Saturday Night Special" (Conway Twitty song), 1988
- "Saturday Night Special", a song by The Runaways from the 1978 album And Now... The Runaways
- A single on Fad Gadget's 1981 album Incontinent
- An all-burgundy uniform worn by the Philadelphia Phillies on May 19, 1979
- Volcker's Saturday Night Special, a U.S. Federal Open Market Committee action to increase interest rates in 1979
- Saturday Night Special (album), a 1975 album by Norman Connors
