= Leaky integrator =

Type of differential equation

A graph of a solution to a leaky integrator; the input changes at T=5.

In mathematics, a leaky integrator equation is a specific differential equation, used to describe a component or system that takes the integral of an input, but gradually leaks a small amount of input over time. It appears commonly in hydraulics, electronics, and neuroscience where it can represent either a single neuron or a local population of neurons.

== Equation ==
The equation is of the form

$$dx/dt = -Ax + C$$

where C is the input and A is the rate of the 'leak'.

=== General solution ===
The equation is a nonhomogeneous first-order linear differential equation. For constant C its solution is

$$x(t) = ke^{-At} + \frac{C}{A}$$

where $k$ is a constant encoding the initial condition.
