= Time Warp (TV series) =

- Starring: Jeff Lieberman; Matt Kearney
- Country of origin: United States
- No. of seasons: 3
- No. of episodes: 33 (list of episodes)

Production
- Running time: 44 min. (first season 22 min.)

Original release
- Network: Discovery Channel; Discovery HD
- Release: March 18, 2008 – October 28, 2009

Time Warp is a popular science-themed television program produced for the Discovery Channel in the United States, in which Jeff Lieberman, an MIT scientist, teacher, and artist, along with high speed camera expert Matt Kearney, use their high speed camera to examine everyday occurrences and singular talents.

Time Warp captured common everyday events and viewed them again in slow motion to teach the principles of physics. To do so, they examined things such as a drop of water, explosions, gunshots, ballet dancing, cornflour, shallow water diving, X games and sometimes some uncanny things like piercing one's cheek or standing on blades.

The high speed cameras were used at as low as 500 frame/second for capturing how dogs drink to as high as 40,000 frame/second for capturing bullets, breaking glass, etc. Speeds above 20,000 frame/second were shot in black and white as the amount of light needed to record in black and white is significantly lower than what's needed to record in color.

== Home media ==
The entire Time Warp series is available on both DVD and Blu-ray sets, making it the first Discovery show to be fully released on Blu-ray. The truncated 3rd season was included in the Season 2 set (not noted on box). Bonus features include: deleted scenes (season 2 only), the pilot episode (Blu-ray season 1 only), and a recap of season 1.

Note: On the Blu-ray season 1, episodes 13 (Cheerleading) and 14 (Trail Bikes), were flipped from broadcast order. On season 2 disc 2, the episode listing is out of sequenced: episodes 6 & 7 are listed after episode 11. Disc 3 has 3rd-season episodes 2 & 3 flipped. Season 2 Blu-ray is out of print. The Blu-ray sets are region free.

== Reception ==
Common Sense Media rated the series 4 out of 5 stars.

== See also ==
- List of Time Warp episodes
- The Slow Mo Guys, a YouTube show of similar purpose.
