= Jeff Lieberman (artist engineer) =

American roboticist (born 1978)

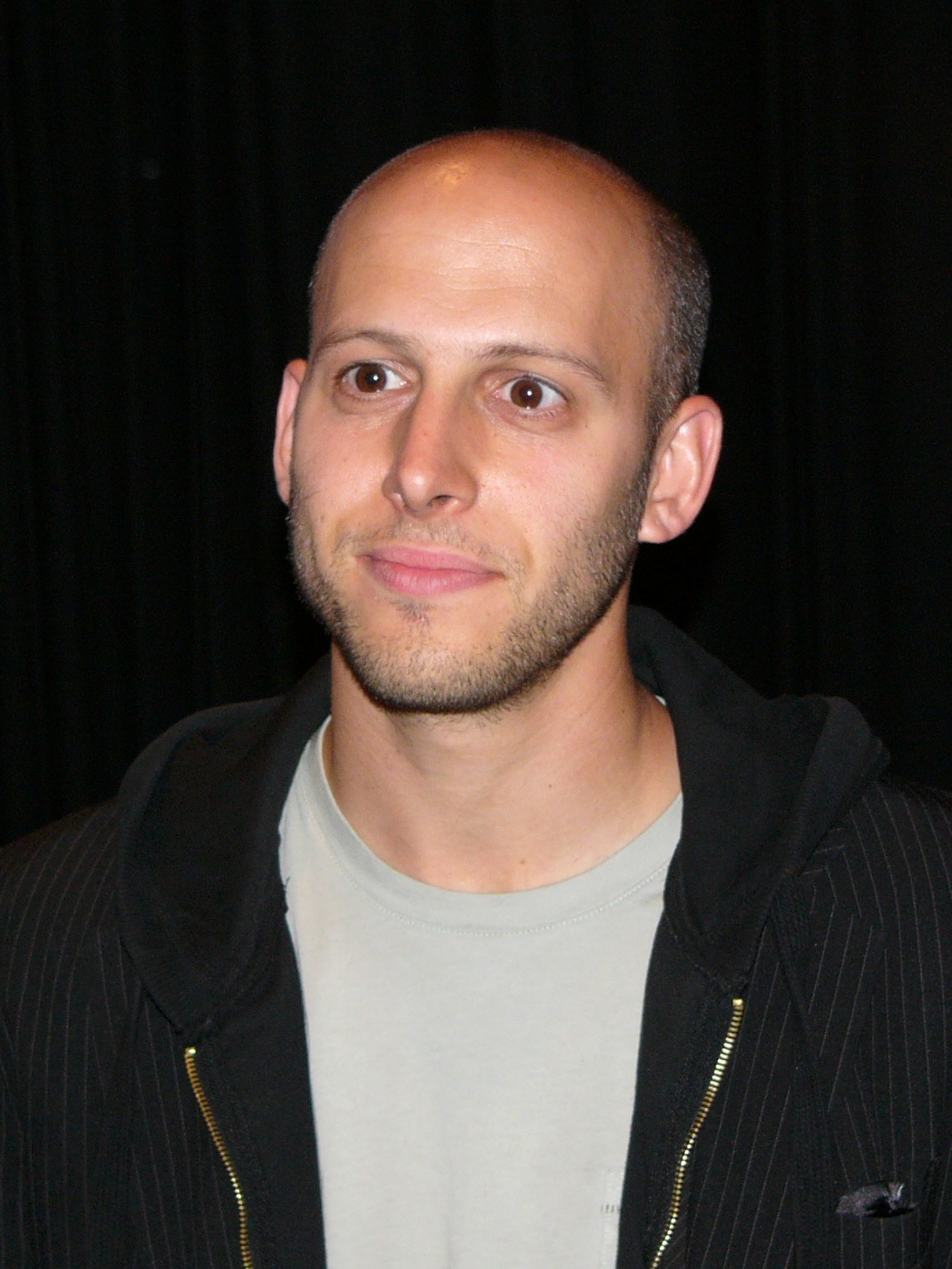
- Lieberman in 2009
- Born: March 1978 (age 47); Florida, United States
- Education: Massachusetts Institute of Technology, SB 2000 Physics, SB 2000 Mathematics, SM 2004 Mechanical Engineering, SM 2006 Media Arts and Sciences
- Occupations: Artist/engineer, television presenter, roboticist
- Website: http://bea.st/

Jeff Lieberman (born March 1978) is an artist and engineer working in a wide variety of artistic and technological media. He was also the host of the documentary show Time Warp on Discovery Channel, and directed a number of short films featuring greatly speeded-up or slowed-down time sequences.

== Early life and education ==
Lieberman earned two bachelor's degrees, in Mathematics and Physics, and two master's degrees, in Mechanical Engineering and Media Arts & Sciences with a focus in Robotics, all from MIT. He took a leave of absence from pursuing a PhD due to the demands of filming. Before his leave, he worked in the MIT Media Lab in Cynthia Breazeal's Personal Robots Group.

== Career ==
One of Lieberman's main interests is making kinetic sculptures. With Daniel Paluska he built the Absolut Quartet, a music machine which has been exhibited at Ars Electronica in Austria.

He has made many technological sculptures, which resulted in him starting his design firm Plebian Design.

He also successfully launched art projects on the crowd-funding site Kickstarter. "One thing that I don’t want to do as an artist is inflate the prices of my work to artificially make them more valuable. Often artists do this in order to make a living; so I wanted to figure out another alternative." he said, explaining why he chose Kickstarter for one of his projects. His first Kickstarter project was Moore Pattern, and a second one, Slow Dance was later converted into an ongoing product. Both projects appear to be minimalist, but incorporate a deep understanding of human visual perception.

Lieberman is also a musician, playing several instruments as well as singing. His first starring role in a feature film was in the romantic musical comedy 83 Errers.

In 2010, Lieberman co-directed a 4-minute music video with Eric Gunther, featuring the indie band OK Go performing their song "End Love". The video was shot in a continuous take using three cameras, running 18 hours from before sunset to 11am the following day. The footage was condensed using time lapse techniques ranging up to 170,000 times speedup, with some brief slow-motion segments also recorded at 1500 frames per second.

The art production is deeply influenced by the relativity of time and of the human bodily perceptions. In his 2011 speech at TEDxCambridge, he exposed his belief that "time and space are modes by which we think and are not condition in which we live", according to Albert Einstein who also affirmed "thought suffers from an optical illusion of consciousness", the illusion that it can exist "a separate person inside an envinronment" while person it can be realized it is pure and undifferentiated energy in motion everywhere, from the time of the Big Bang to the ethernity. The feeling to be alive, the "I am" is all what remains, without the possibility to know its content, form and structure, and definitely what we are.

== Plebian Design ==
Plebian Design is Lieberman's design firm, which has done projects like Quartet and Patterned by Nature, which is a sculptural ribbon 10 feet (3.0 m) wide and 90 feet (27 m) in length.

== Wonder Machines ==
After the success of a Kickstarter project, Lieberman decided to offer his artwork Slow Dance as an ongoing product through his new company, Wonder Machines. The modestly priced artwork is a simple, minimalist wooden frame incorporating stroboscopic LED lighting and a vibrating electromagnetic coil, which can animate a small item such as a feather or a flower in apparent slow motion.

== See also ==
- Wen-Ying Tsai — another kinetic sculptor who has used stroboscopic effects
