= North Carolina Museum of Natural Sciences =

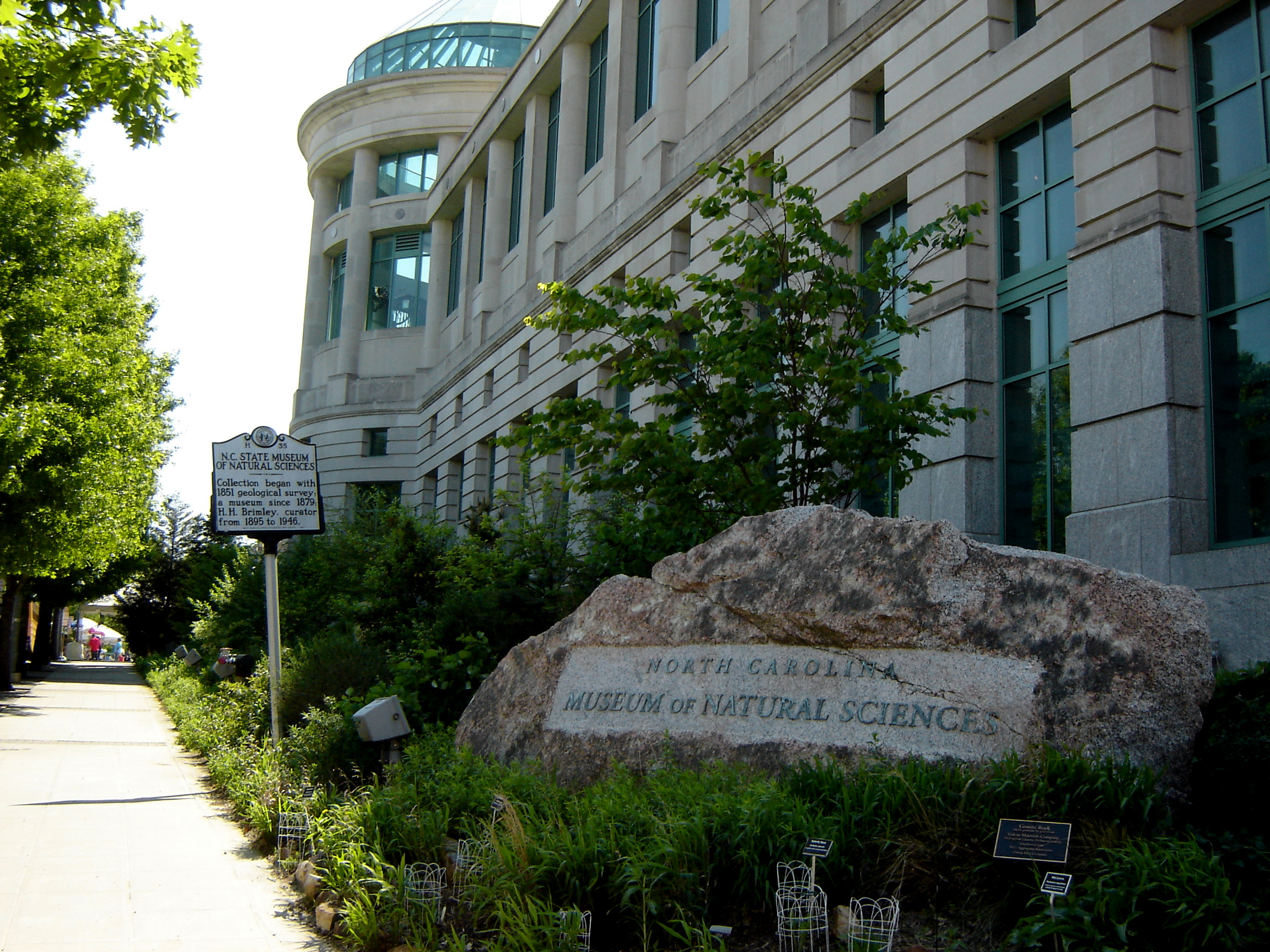
- View of the Nature Exploration Center from E Jones Street

- Location within North Carolina Location within the United States
- Established: 1879
- Location: Raleigh, North Carolina
- Coordinates: 35.782186°N 78.639422°W
- Type: Natural history museum
- Visitors: 1.2 million (annually)
- Director: Dr. Denise Young
- Website: naturalsciences.org

The North Carolina Museum of Natural Sciences (NCMNS) is a natural history museum in Raleigh, North Carolina. The museum is the oldest in the state, and the largest natural history museum in the Southeastern United States.

The museum is made up of six facilities, divided between five campuses. The newest facility, the North Carolina Museum of Natural Sciences at Greenville, was announced in 2020 and opened to the public on September 18, 2021. NCMNS is a division of the state Department of Natural and Cultural Resources.

== History ==
Former logo, featuring the sperm whale "Trouble"

The North Carolina State Museum was created in 1879 by combining two existing state-owned collections of geologic and agricultural specimens. The museum was originally housed in the Briggs Building on Fayetteville Street. The museum's collections, outreach and education programs, and status grew over the next 60 years under the stewardship of Herbert Brimley. In 1887 the museum was placed under the management of the Department of Agriculture, and was moved to the department's office building: a former hotel on Edenton Street across from the capitol building. An annex was added in 1899 as the collection grew, and the entire facility was moved to a purpose-built building in 1924. The facility was later renamed the North Carolina State Museum of Natural History.

In the 1950s and again in the 1990s, shifts in education further expanded the museum's holdings as universities donated their collections to the state. In 1986, the museum was renamed to The North Carolina State Museum of Natural Sciences.

In 2000, the museum expanded with the opening of the Museum of Forestry in Whiteville. This facility was later overhauled and reopened in 2015 as the NC Museum of Natural Sciences in Whiteville. Another location was added in 2004, with the opening of the Prairie Ridge Ecostation for Wildlife and Learning. The museum expanded its downtown campus in 2012 with the adjacent Nature Research Center. The collection contains over 1.7 million specimens, including amphibians, reptiles, birds, fish, mammals, invertebrates, invertebrate and vertebrate fossils, plants, geology, and meteorites.

On July 14, 2014, a dinosaur replica along with other items were stolen from NCMNS by two accomplices. The offenders turned themselves in on July 17. The replica, along with the other items were recovered.

In 2020, the museum announced its acquisition of the Dueling Dinosaurs, a well-preserved and scientifically important specimen from Montana of a Triceratops and Nanotyrannus possibly locked in combat. First found in 2006, there were unsuccessful attempts to sell it to museums or private collectors for over a decade until the NCMNS reached out in 2016, prompting negotiations to purchase the fossil. Legal issues concerning mineral rights significantly slowed these negotiations until they were resolved in 2020. Funds for the purchase were raised by the nonprofit Friends of the North Carolina Museum of Natural Sciences. Following the construction of a dedicated display wing in the Nature Research Center, the Dueling Dinosaurs exhibit was officially opened to the public in 2024 in the newly-built SECU DinoLab.

== Nature Exploration Center ==
The Center is located on Jones Street in downtown Raleigh.

=== First floor ===
- Natural Treasures of North Carolina – Contains dioramas of various wildlife and artifacts pertaining to nature in North Carolina, such as megalodon jaws and a Carolina parakeet specimen.
- Coastal North Carolina – Displays dioramas of coastal North Carolina ecosystems, including aquariums featuring live fish native to North Carolina's coast and inland waterways.
- WRAL 3-D Theater – A 250 seat 3-D film venue.
- Box Office – Sells tickets to the WRAL 3-D theater and the special exhibits.

=== Second floor ===
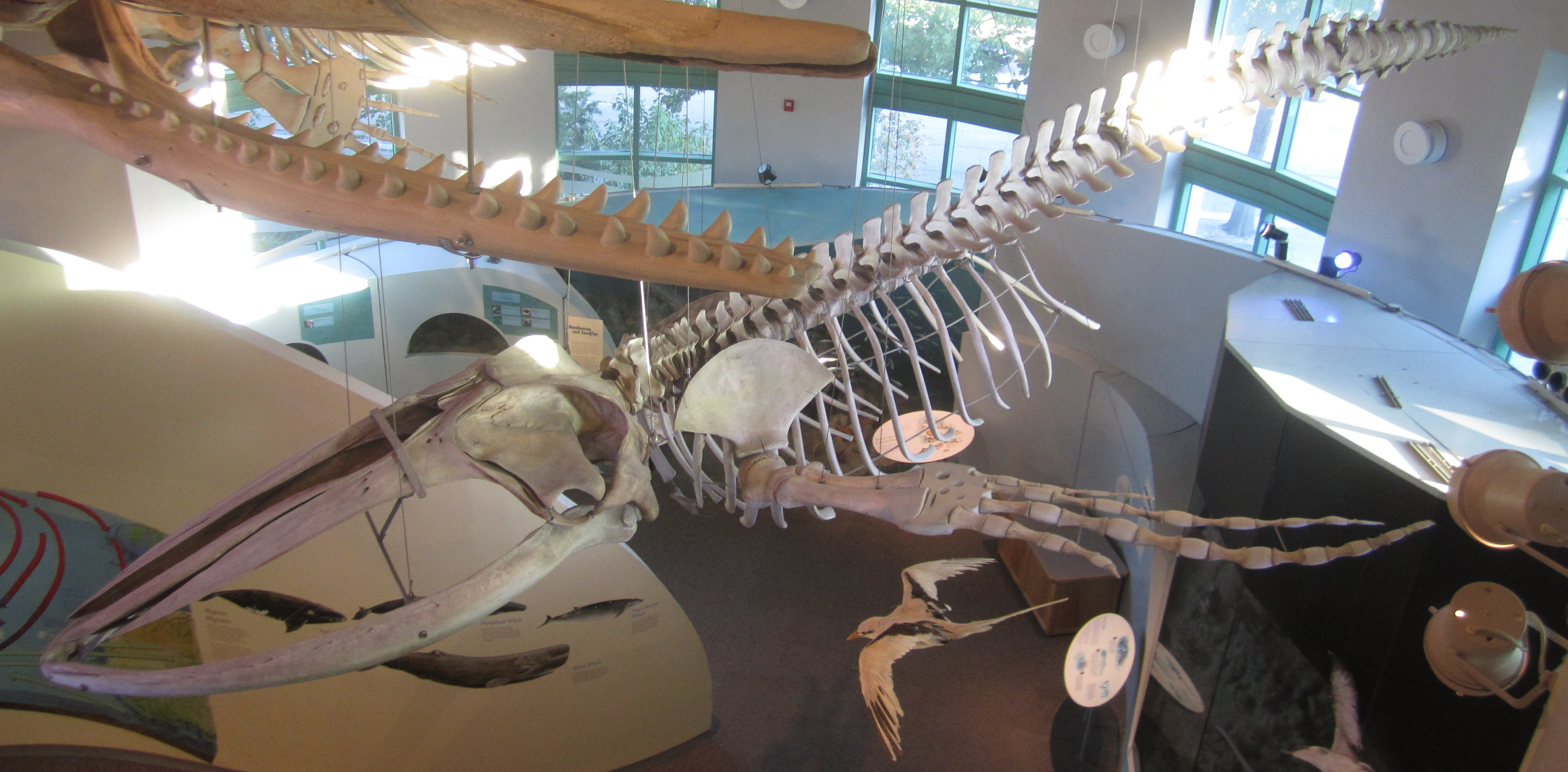
Whale skeletons over the "Coastal North Carolina" hall.

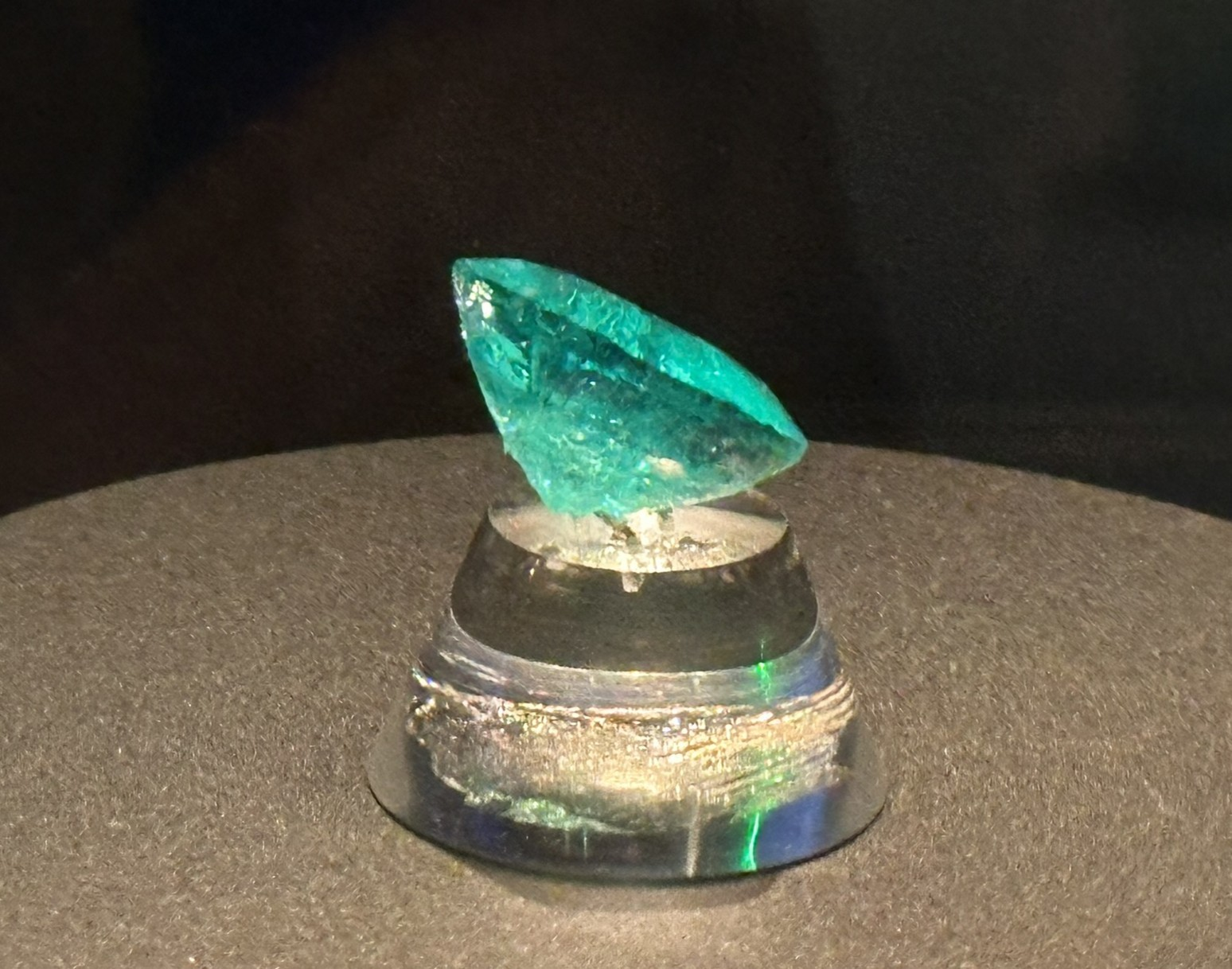
The "Carolina Emperor" emerald, the largest cut emerald known from North America

- Coastal North Carolina Overlook – Displays an array of marine mammal skeletons overlooking the "Coastal North Carolina" hall, including the museum's former mascot, a sperm whale specimen named "Trouble" that had washed ashore on Wrightsville Beach in 1928. Other specimens on display include a blue whale skeleton, a rare True's beaked whale skeleton, and the skeleton of "Mayflower", a North Atlantic right whale collected in 1874 which has been on display for over a century.
- North Carolina: Mountains to the Sea – Displays North Carolina's natural habitats from the western mountains through the central Piedmont and on to the Coastal Plain, as well as native North Carolina species in danger of extinction.
- Underground North Carolina – Contains gems and minerals from North Carolina, including North America's largest cut emerald, the 64.8-carat Carolina Emperor, as well as ground, soil, and seismic displays.
- Nature's Explorers – Exhibits the museum's beginnings, and early methods of specimen collection and preservation. Includes a model of an ocean sunfish caught in 1937, as well as Miss Kagawa, one of the only Japanese Friendship Dolls to remain on display throughout World War II.
- Discovery Room – A family-oriented hands-on exhibit.
- Special Exhibition gallery – Temporary space for bi-annual special exhibitions.

=== Third floor ===
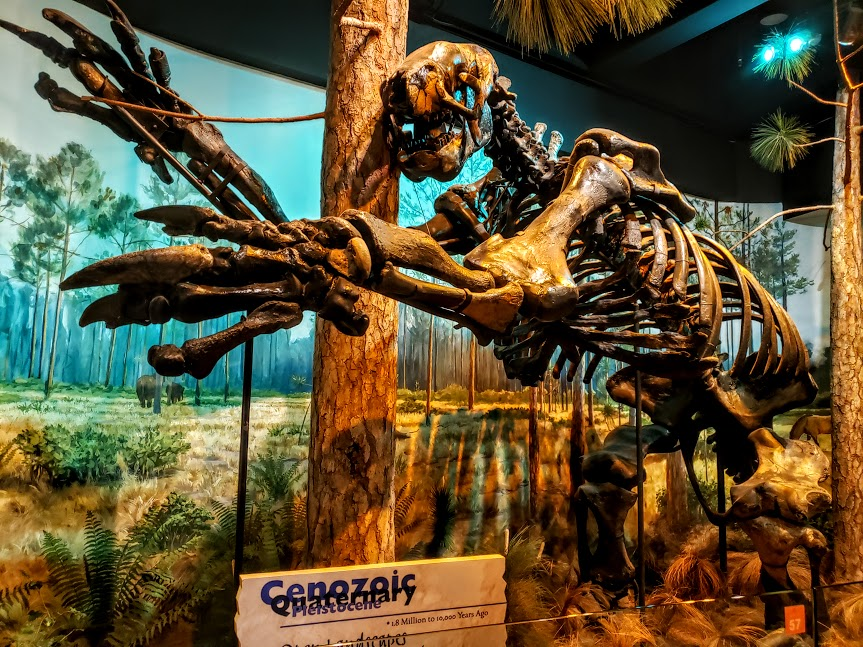
Eremotherium fossil in "Prehistoric North Carolina" hall.

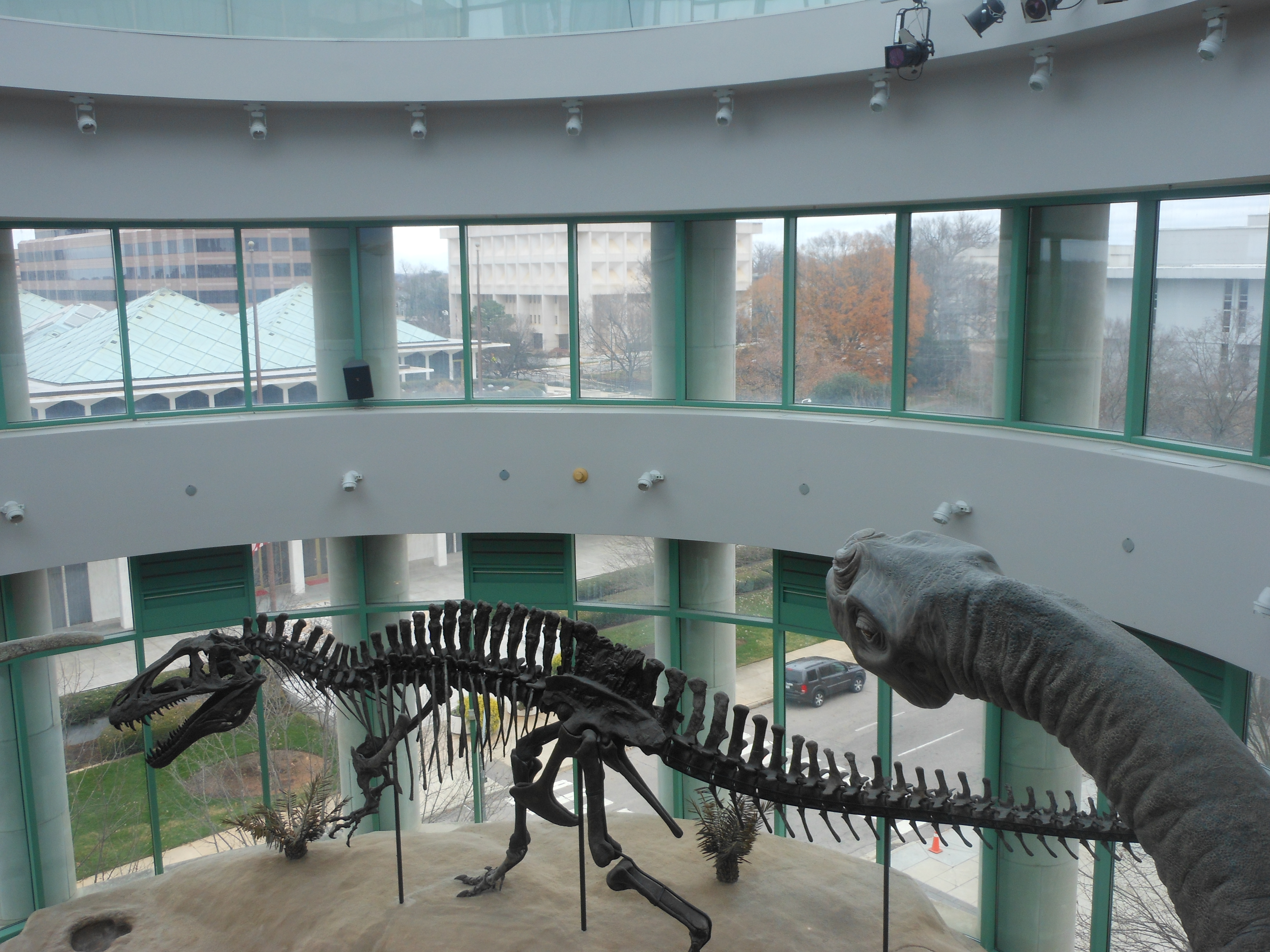
Acrocanthosaurus skeleton in the "Terror of the South" exhibit

- Prehistoric North Carolina – Chronicles prehistoric life in the state and throughout North America. This includes prehistoric Mesozoic life, such as petrified wood, skeleton casts of Prestosuchus and the dinosaurs Albertosaurus, Edmontosaurus & Pachycephalosaurus, as well as the skeleton of "Willo", a famous well-preserved Thescelosaurus specimen from Montana, which was formerly thought to have a fossilized heart. For Cenozoic life, the hall contains the reconstruction of an Eremotherium giant ground sloth excavated by the museum near Wilmington, as well as a walkway through a reconstructed late Eocene ocean ecosystem.
- Terror of the South – exhibits a skeletal reconstruction of "Acro" or "Fran" (NCSM 14345), the largest and most complete Acrocanthosaurus specimen, as well as a life-size model of the giant sauropod dinosaur Astrodon. The original skull of "Fran" is also displayed separately.
- Tropical Connections – Contains a large interactive globe displaying climate regions of the Earth and the connections between North and South America, as well as live tropical animals such as emerald tree boas and poison dart frogs.
- Mountain Cove – Contains dioramas about the ecosystems and wildlife of North Carolina's Appalachian Mountains, including live animal displays.
- Snakes of North Carolina – Live displays of snakes native to North Carolina.
- Windows on the World – A theater, used for demonstrations, talks, and live animal visits.
- Curiosity Classrooms – Two classroom spaces.
- Bridge Across Time – An open-air bridge connecting the Nature Exploration Center to the Nature Research Center, illustrating the traces left by ancient life over geologic time.

=== Fourth floor ===
- Arthropod Zoo – Live and static exhibits of the insects, crustaceans, arachnids and other arthropods in North Carolina.
- Living Conservatory – A dry tropical forest exhibit with various live plants and animals native to Central and South America, most notably over 200 tropical butterflies and a two-toed sloth, as well as ornate wood turtles, Stuart's milk snakes, cichlids, and a Brazilian black tarantula. A chamber displays chrysalides of developing butterflies and butterflies that have recently emerged.

== Nature Research Center ==
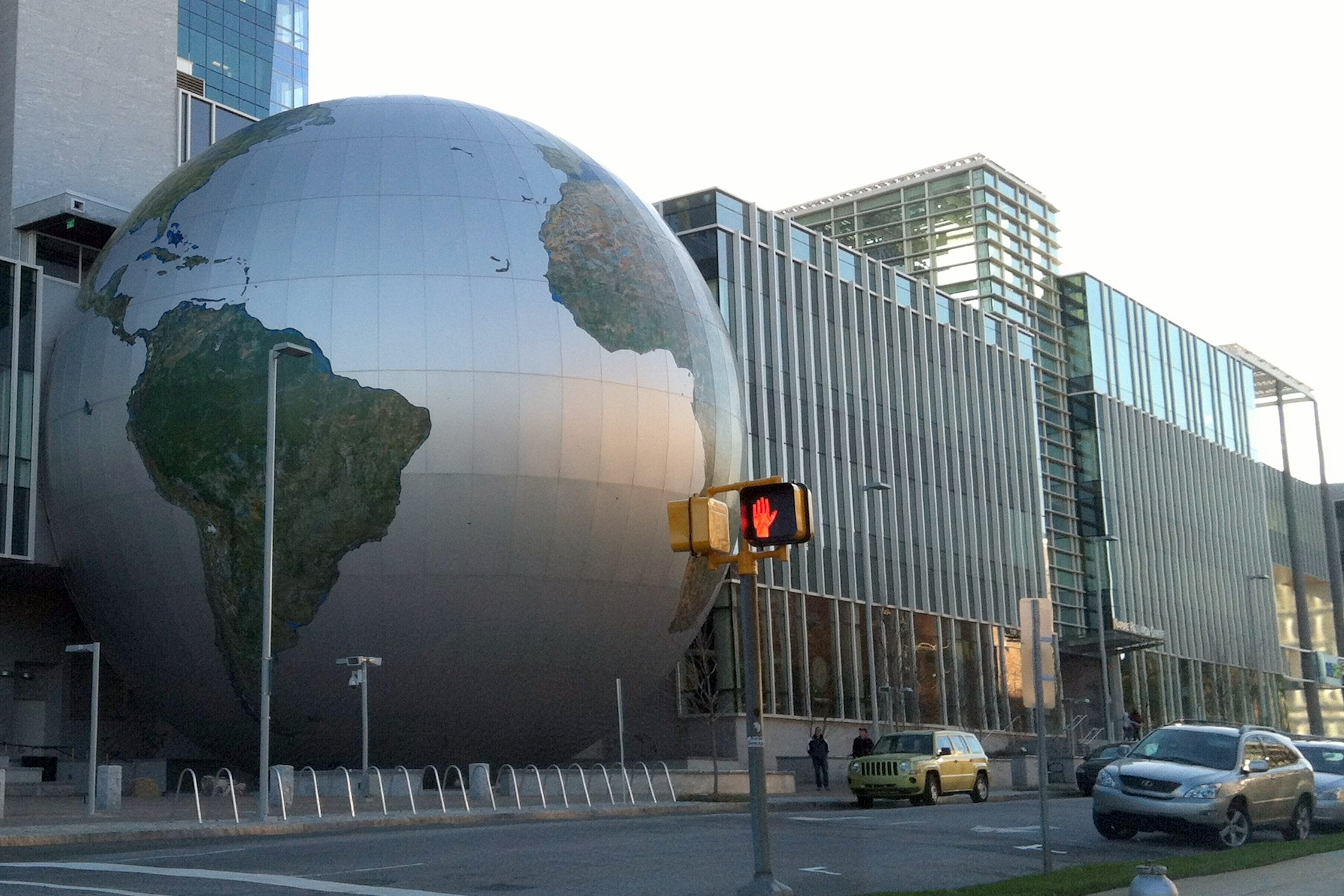
The "Daily Planet" globe is a 3-storey multimedia theater on the museum interior

The Nature Research Center (NRC) is an 80,000 sq ft (7,400 m^{2}), four-story wing across the street from the Nature Exploration Center. The NRC and NEC are connected by a breezeway. The initial opening (April 20, 2012) lasted for 24 hours and drew 70,000 visitors.

The NRC provides hands-on activities and visitor-viewing of scientists working in the NRC's four research laboratories. The museum also makes use of distance learning to broadcast lessons and virtual field trips to classrooms around the state.

=== First floor ===
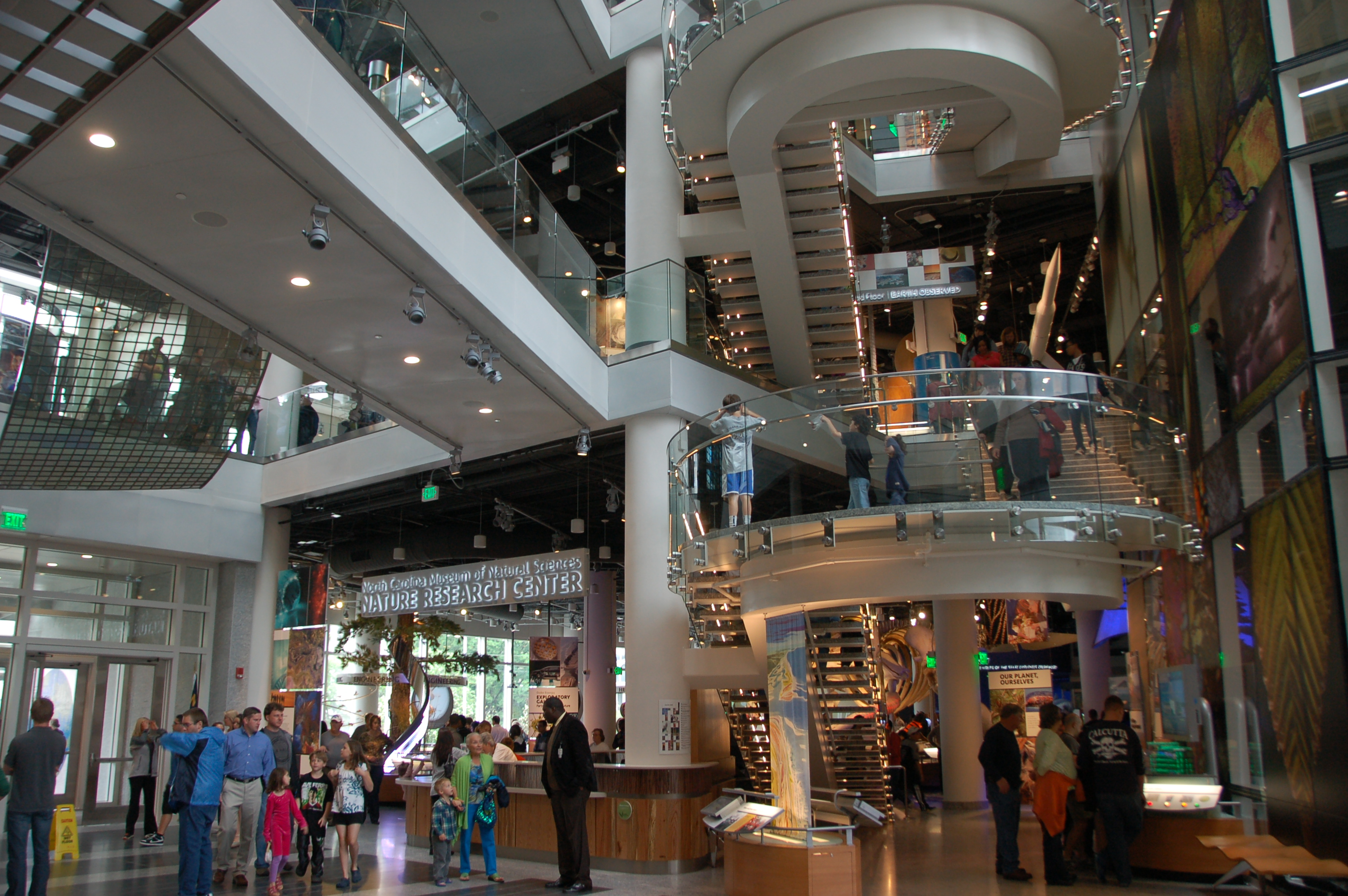
Nature Research Center

- SECU Daily Planet Theater – Inside the globe, a three-story theater hosts science presentations and scenes from nature.
- Our Changing Ocean – A 10,000 US gal (38,000 L) aquarium replicates a typical hardbottom habitat off the North Carolina coast.
- Investigating Right Whales – Visitors can see and touch the skeleton of "Stumpy", a North Atlantic right whale killed in a boat collision in 2004, whose death led to laws that require slower cargo ship speeds in whale migration routes.
- Protecting Fresh Water – Displays on the importance of clean waterways and how they can coexist with urban development.

=== Second floor ===
- Researching Weather – Displays methods used to study the weather.
- Diversity of Life – Displays about biodiversity and the extinction crisis faced by modern species, including live animal displays.
- Window on Animal Health – Visitors can view veterinary staff, students, and interns working on real medical procedures. The window is equipped with 2-way audio between visitors and staff and offers video for visitors to view close-ups of images and medical procedures. Patients include species such as reptiles, amphibians, fish, birds, small mammals and invertebrates.
- Our Changing Climate – Shows recorded testimonials from experts and students about the impacts of climate change.

=== Third floor ===
- Unraveling DNA – Displays about DNA replication, barcoding and model organisms, including a giant model of a DNA strand.
- Postcards from Space – Collection of meteorites.
- Ancient Fossils, New Discoveries – Displays of various fossils across geologic time, including a cast of a Nanotyrannus skeleton, fossil predators from the Triassic Period, mammoths & mastodons from the Ice Age, and Ediacaran fossils representing some of the earliest complex life on Earth (542-635 million years ago).
- Planet Micro – large-scale model reconstructions of microbes.

=== Hands-on labs ===
The Nature Research Center's hands-on spaces are open-to-the-public interactive educational spaces.

- Investigate Lab (third floor) – This lab focuses on advances in biotechnology and microbiology, including protozoa and genetic engineering.
- Naturalist Center – Features some of the museum's 20,000 education specimens such as fossils, bones, preserved reptiles, and birds. This exhibit also showcases audio and video of certain specimens at two interactive tabletops.
- Vis Lab (third floor) – Demonstrates modeling and simulation technologies, and offers classes in electronics and computer programming.

=== Research labs ===
The Nature Research Center's five research labs are part of the museum's Research and Collections department. These spaces (normally used for behind-the-scenes work) have transparent glass walls through which the public can observe research scientists. The atrium is home to the LCD sculpture Patterned by Nature.

Dinosaur fossil found in Utah. It is about 75 million years old. Have a beak and no teeth. Scientists will study it to see if it is a new specie

- SECU DinoLab (first floor) – Opened in 2024, this timed-entry research lab allows visitors to view the ongoing excavation of the Dueling Dinosaurs specimen, in addition to other interactive displays about the Cretaceous, such as the cast of a Nothronychus skeleton.
- Biodiversity and Earth Observation Research Laboratory (second floor) – This laboratory is the center for exploration of the flora and fauna of the community, state and planet. Studies focus on such areas as mammalian movement ecology.
- Astronomy and Space Observation Research Laboratory (third floor) – Astronomers in this lab use large telescopes around the world to investigate the origins of the Solar System by studying the chemical composition of gas clouds around forming stars.
- Genomics and Microbiology Research Laboratory (third floor) – In this lab, biologists conduct a wide spectrum of molecular genetic studies to examine DNA-based relationships among primates (called comparative evolutionary genomics).
- Paleontology and Geology Research Laboratory (third floor) – The focus of this laboratory is the morphology, evolutionary relationships and paleoecology of theropod dinosaurs—a group that includes the iconic mega predator Tyrannosaurus rex as well as all living birds.

== Satellite facilities and branches ==
=== Prairie Ridge Ecostation ===
Prairie Ridge Ecostation (45 acres (180,000 m^{2})) is a satellite facility and outdoor classroom located 6 miles (9.7 km) from the museum's downtown Raleigh locations. It includes Piedmont prairie, forest, ponds, a stream, and sustainable building features integrated with a wildlife-friendly landscape.

Prairie Ridge is part of the museum's mission of enhancing public understanding and appreciation of the natural environment by providing an outdoor learning space while acting as a model for renewable and sustainable energy.

The facility opened a Nature PlaySpace on Saturday, September 28, 2013.

=== North Carolina Museum of Natural Sciences at Whiteville ===
The North Carolina Museum of Natural Sciences at Whiteville, North Carolina, formerly known as the North Carolina Museum of Forestry, is a satellite facility of the North Carolina Museum of Natural Sciences. Its mission is to celebrate the natural history and cultural heritage of North Carolina's forests through interpretive exhibits, educational programming, and the preservation of natural and man-made materials that demonstrate the ongoing relationship of forests and people.

Displays and interactive exhibits include an outdoor Tree Trail and Fossil Dig Pit, and the museum offers educational program experiences and special events.

=== North Carolina Museum of Natural Sciences at Contentnea Creek ===
The North Carolina Museum of Natural Sciences at Contentnea Creek, formerly known as the Grifton Nature & Science Center, is a satellite facility and outdoor classroom located in Grifton, North Carolina. It features hiking and paddling trails centered around Contentnea Creek, along with an observatory and outdoor classroom.

=== North Carolina Museum of Natural Sciences at Greenville ===
The North Carolina Museum of Natural Sciences at Greenville, North Carolina formerly known as A Time For Science (ATFS), is a satellite facility of the North Carolina Museum of Natural Sciences located in Greenville, North Carolina. It and the Grifton Nature and Science Center were acquired through a partnership between NCMNS and ATFS. The center was renovated with new exhibits being added and reopened in September 2021. The Museum at Greenville is largely based on the Raleigh facility, but with more exhibits focusing on subjects relevant to northeastern North Carolina such as pirates and pollinators, and includes resources from East Carolina University.

== Notable annual events ==
NCMNS hosts many special events through the year. The most notable are:

- BugFest, held in mid-September every year, is a free day-long festival devoted to insects. This event attracts more than 35,000 visitors per year. A smaller version of the festival, called BugFest South, is held at the Whiteville facility in May or June.
- Dia de la Ciencia y la Cultura - a fully bilingual (Spanish-English) celebration that blends science, culture, and community across the Museum of Natural Sciences' two buildings.
- Astronomy Days is a two-day event that explores the wonders of the universe through technology, telescopes, engaging talks by scientists and special guests, and hands-on activities. Usually takes place in January or February.

== Gallery ==
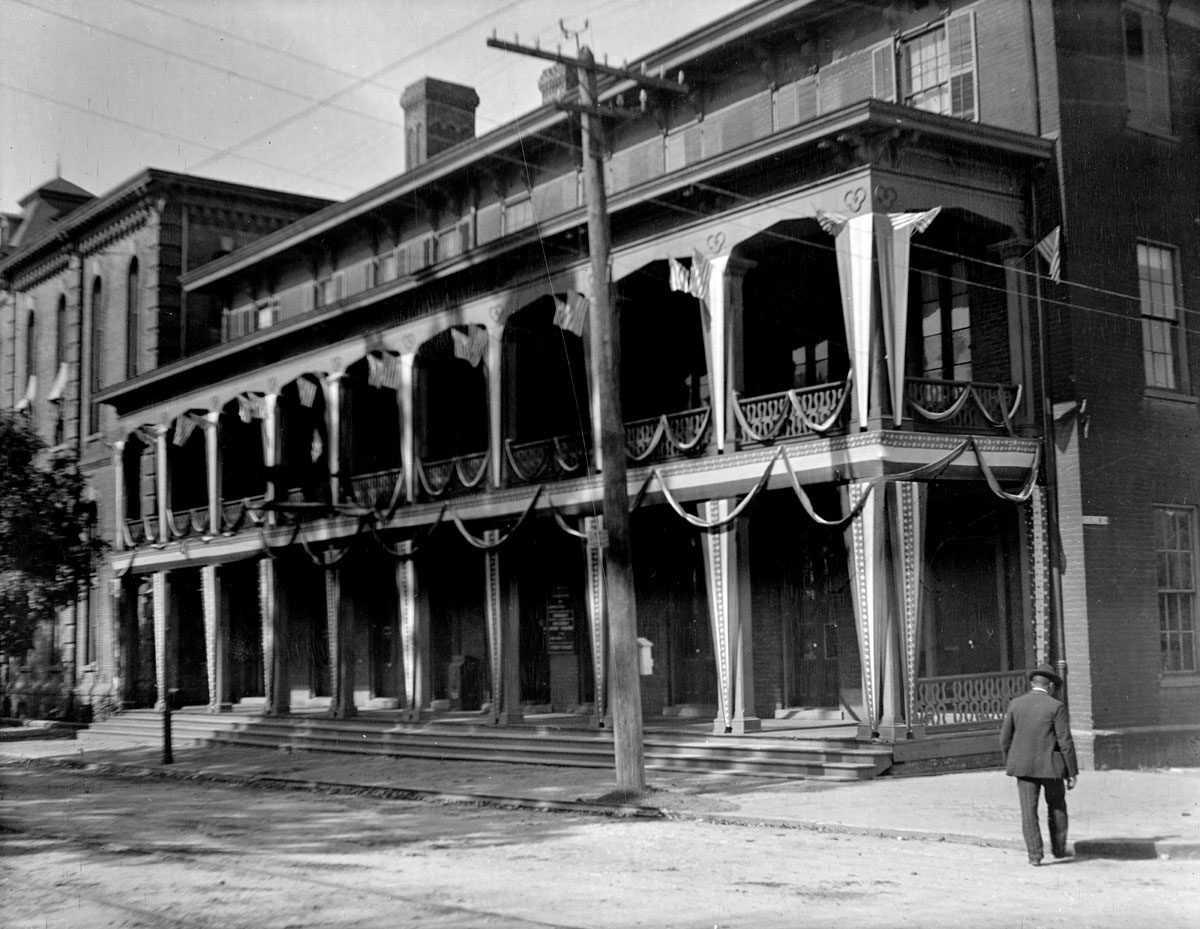
The Agricultural Building (the site of the museum between 1887 and 1924) ca. 1900s

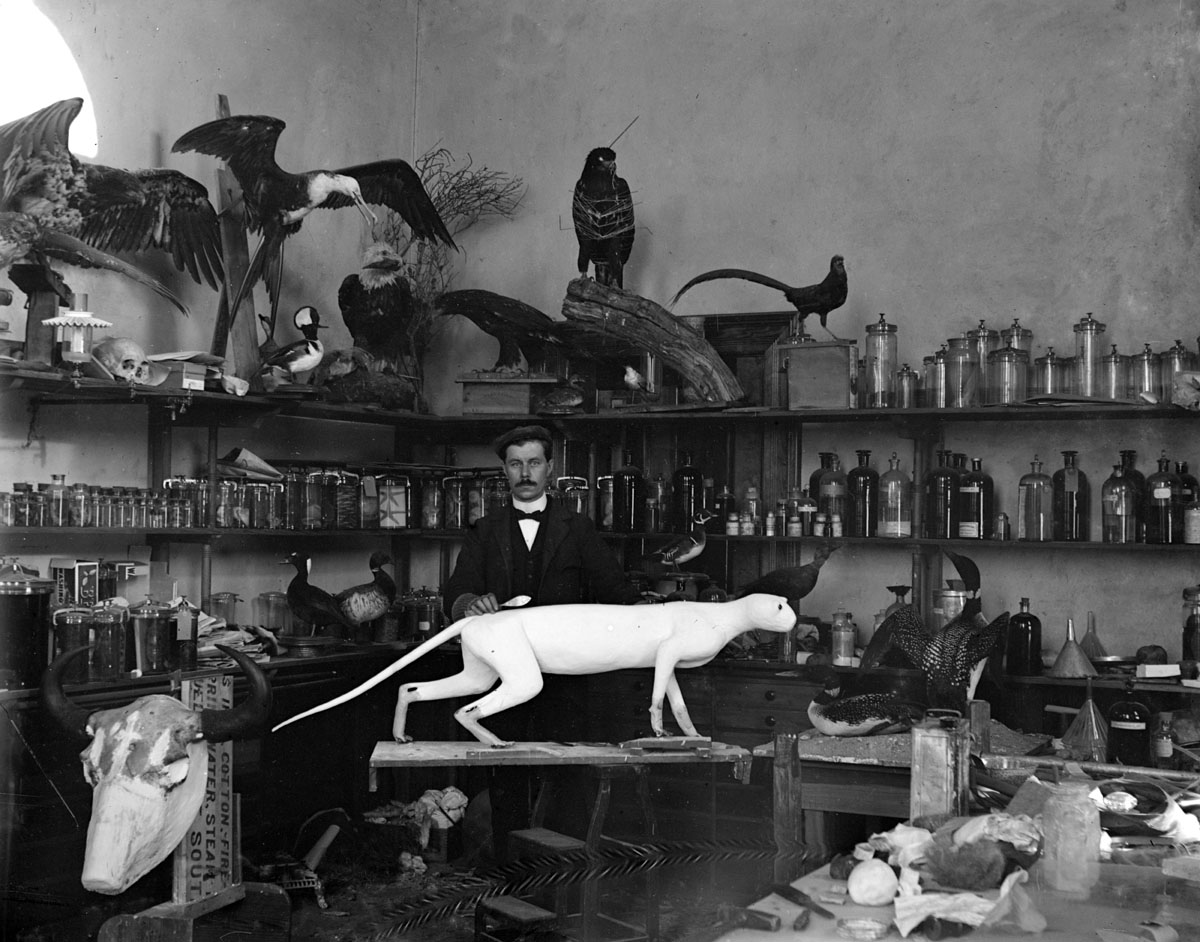
Specimen collection ca. 1900

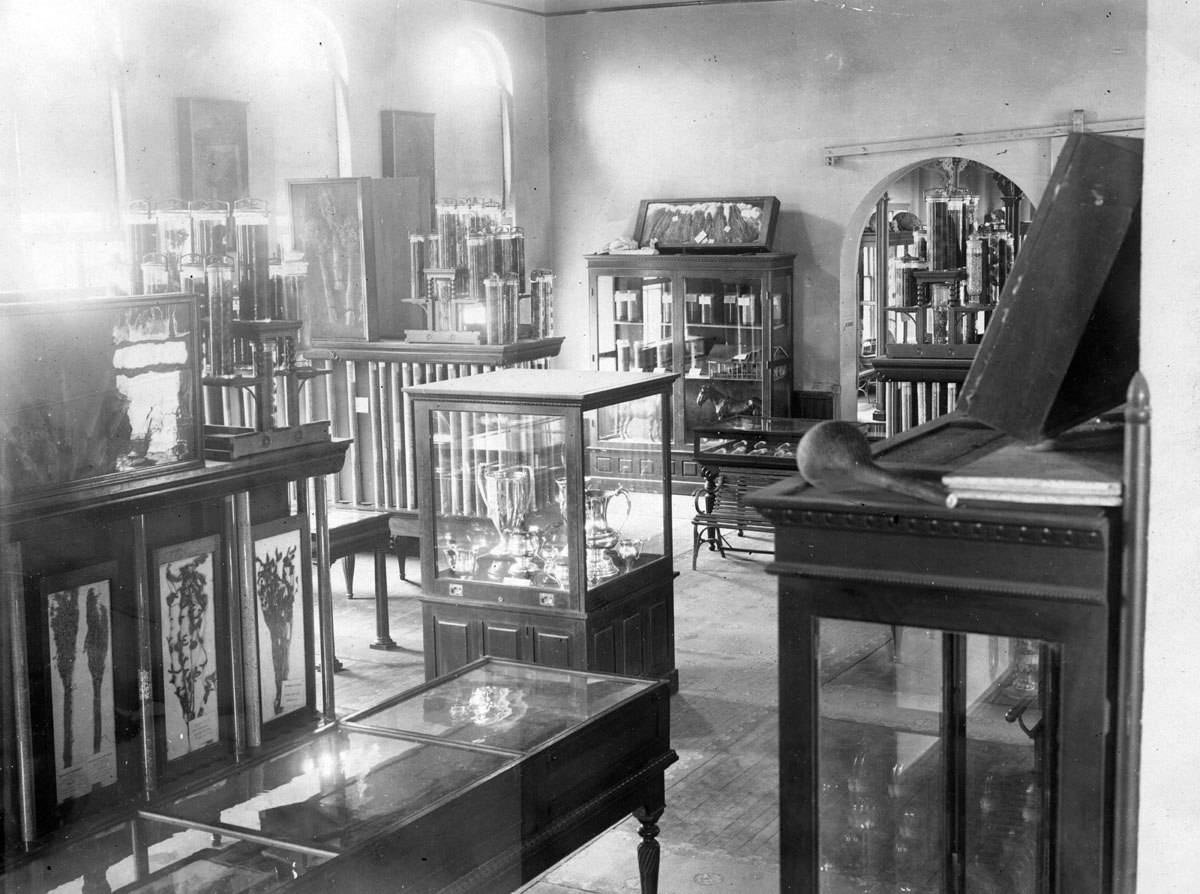
"Mineral Room" of museum ca. 1900s

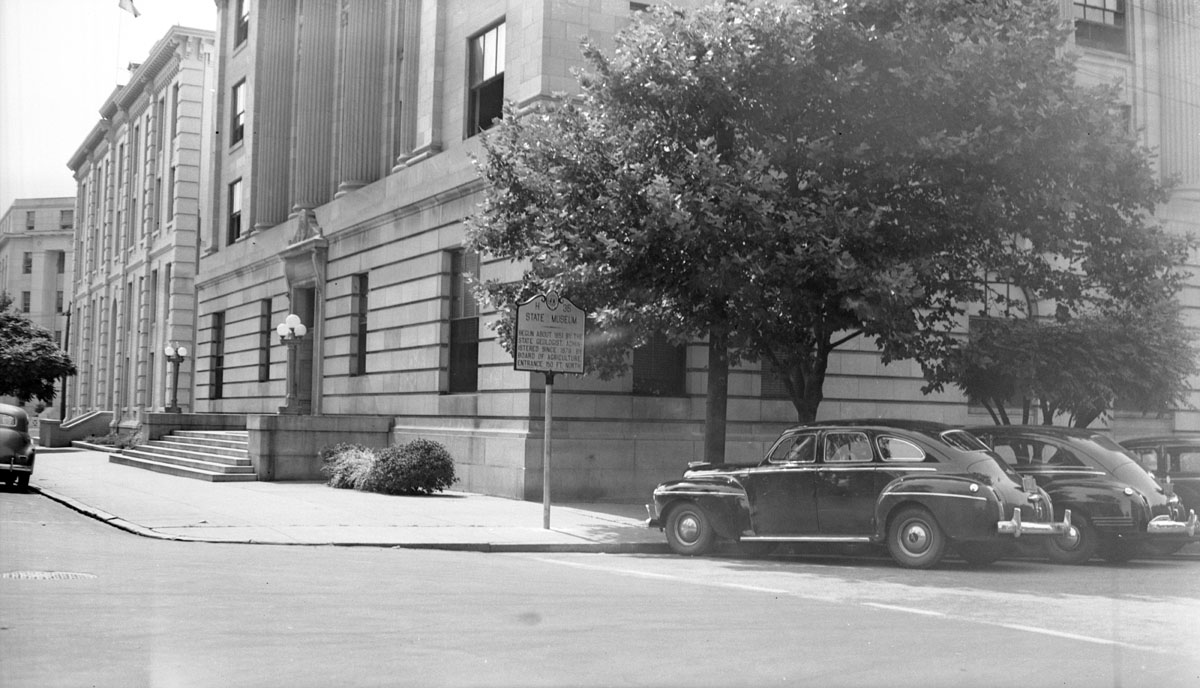
Exterior of the Museum building (now the Nature Exploration Center) ca. 1942

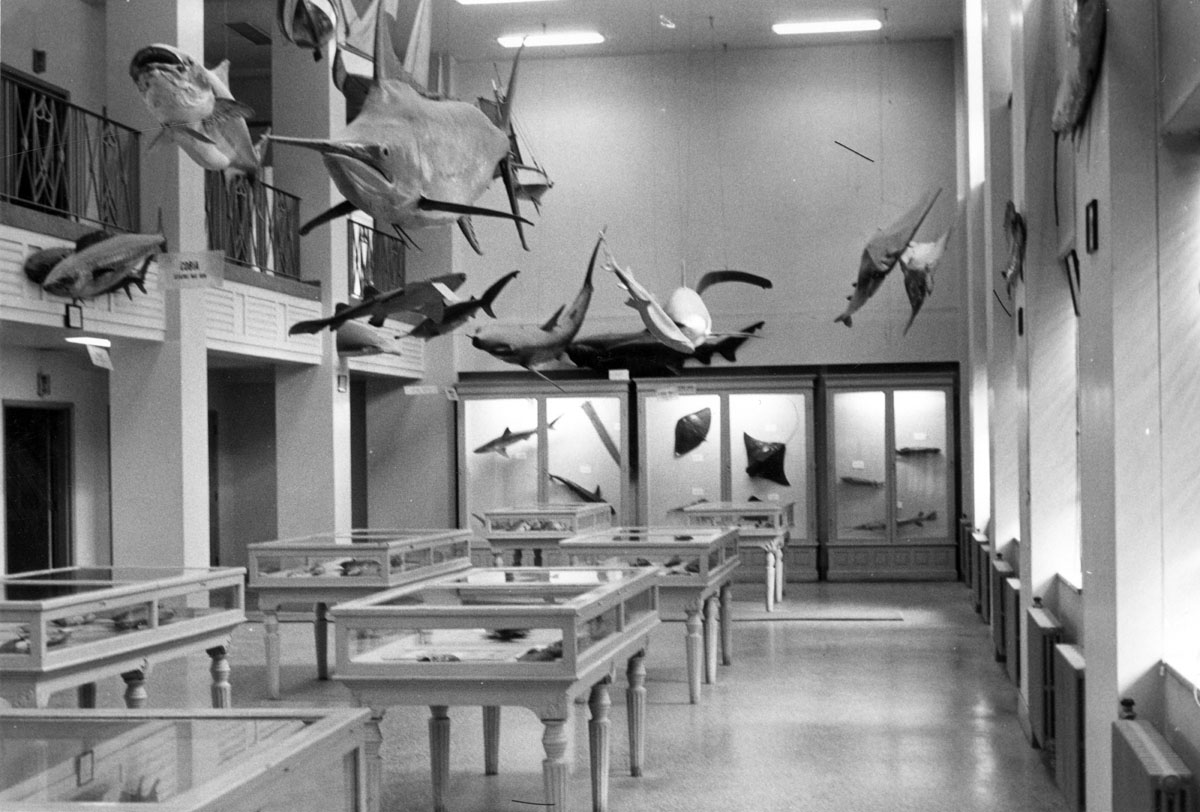
Museum interior ca. 1960s

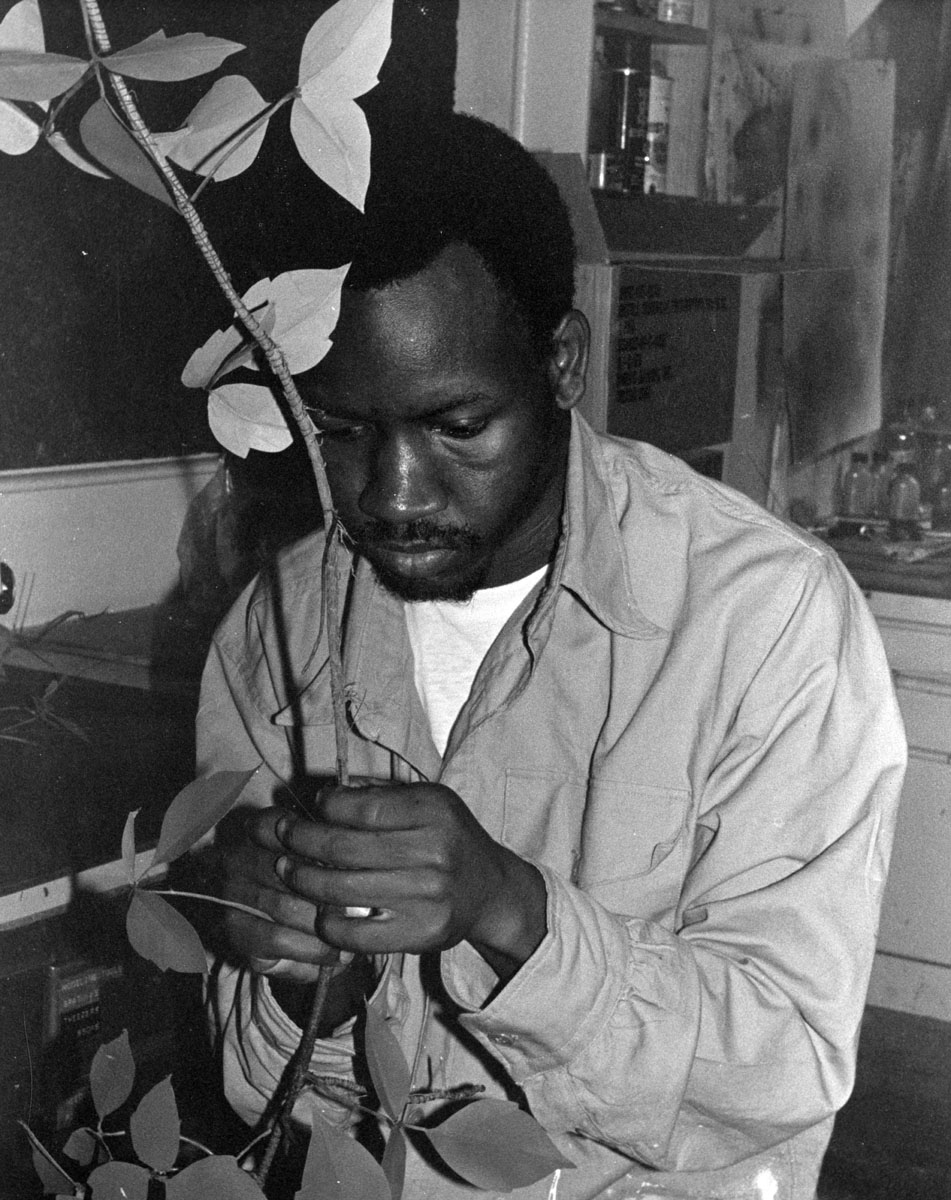
An exhibit preparator ca. 1981.

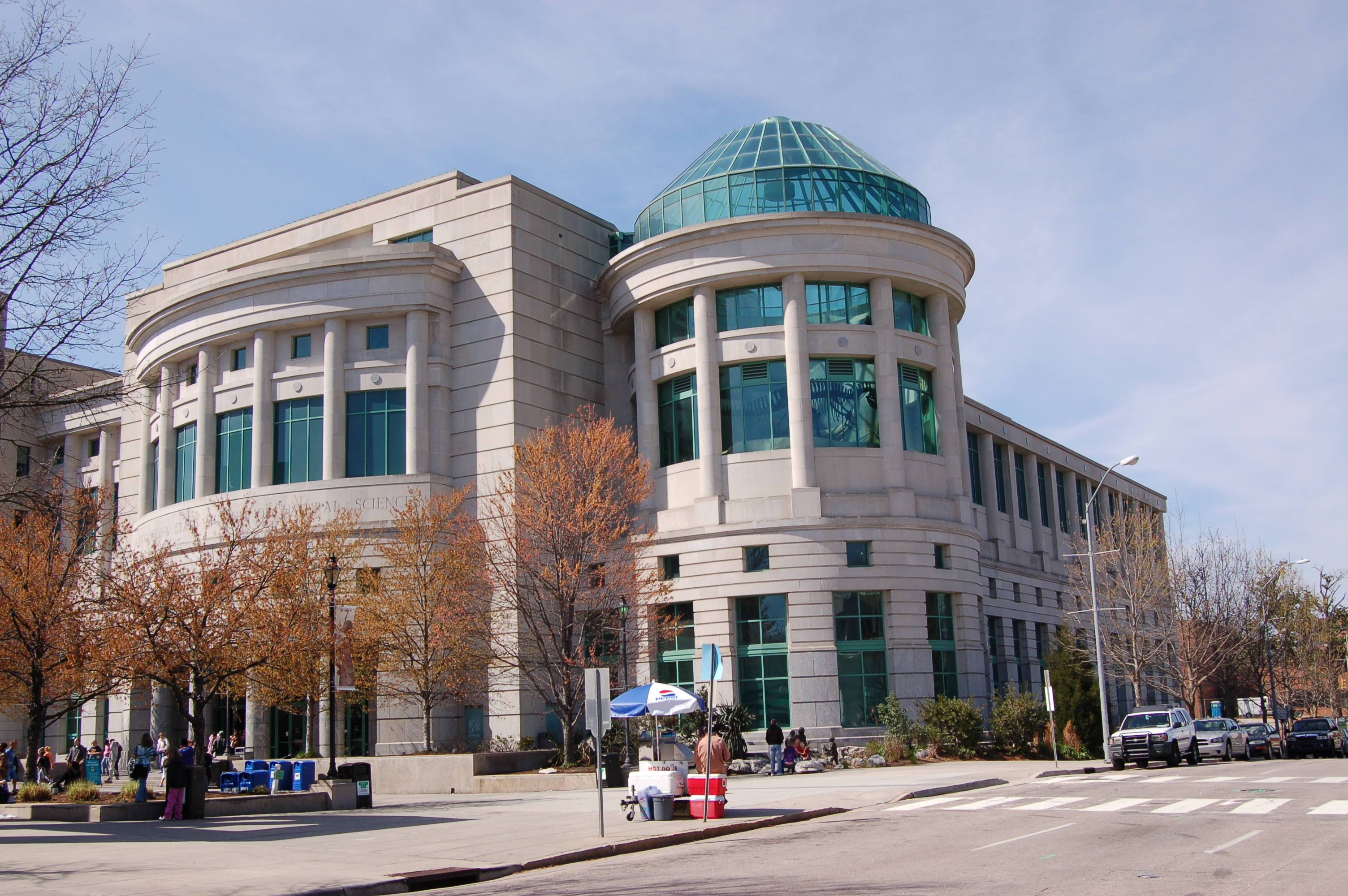
Museum building circa 2007, prior to construction of Nature Research Center

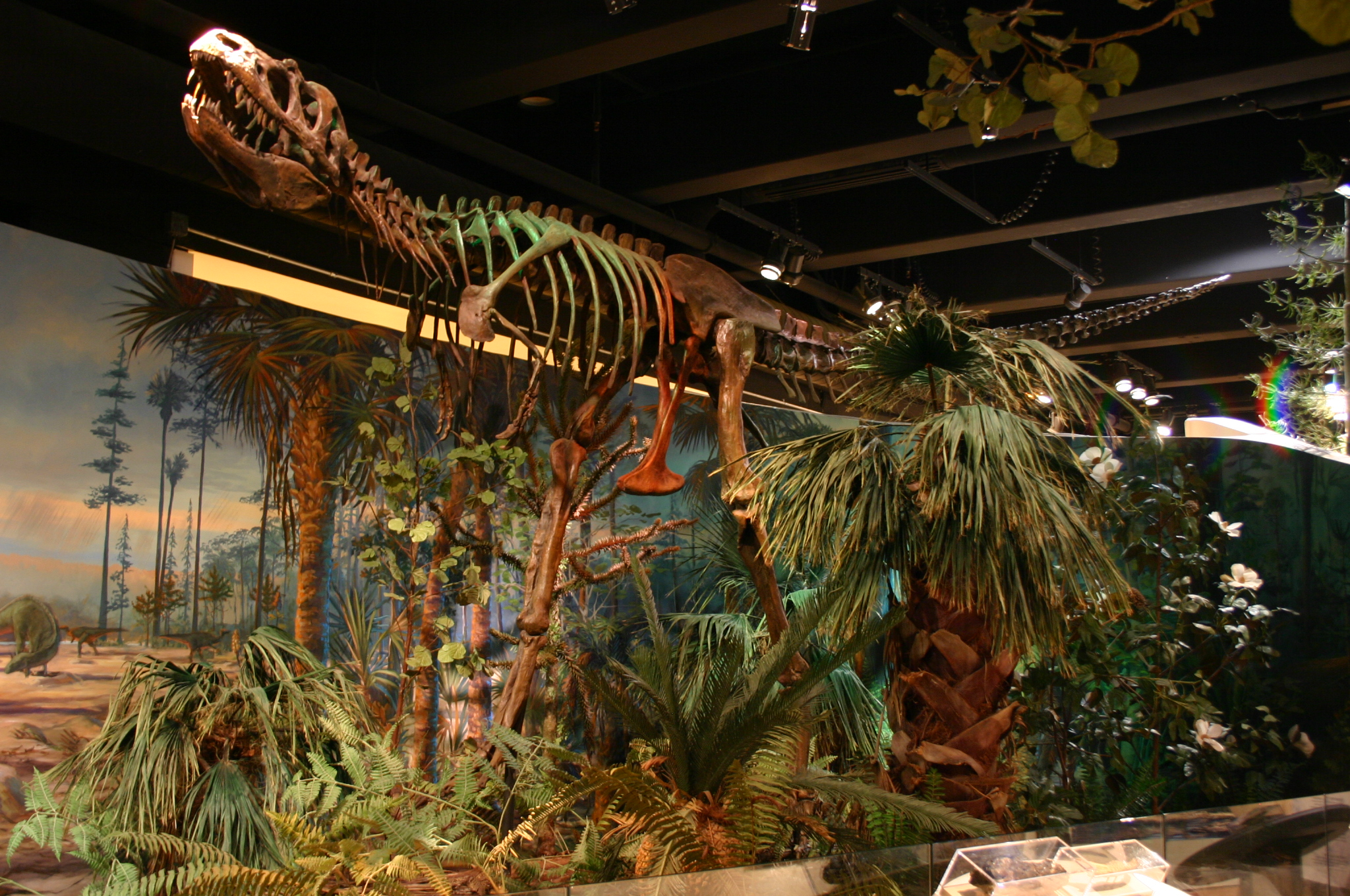
Albertosaurus skeleton mount in the "Prehistoric North Carolina" hall.

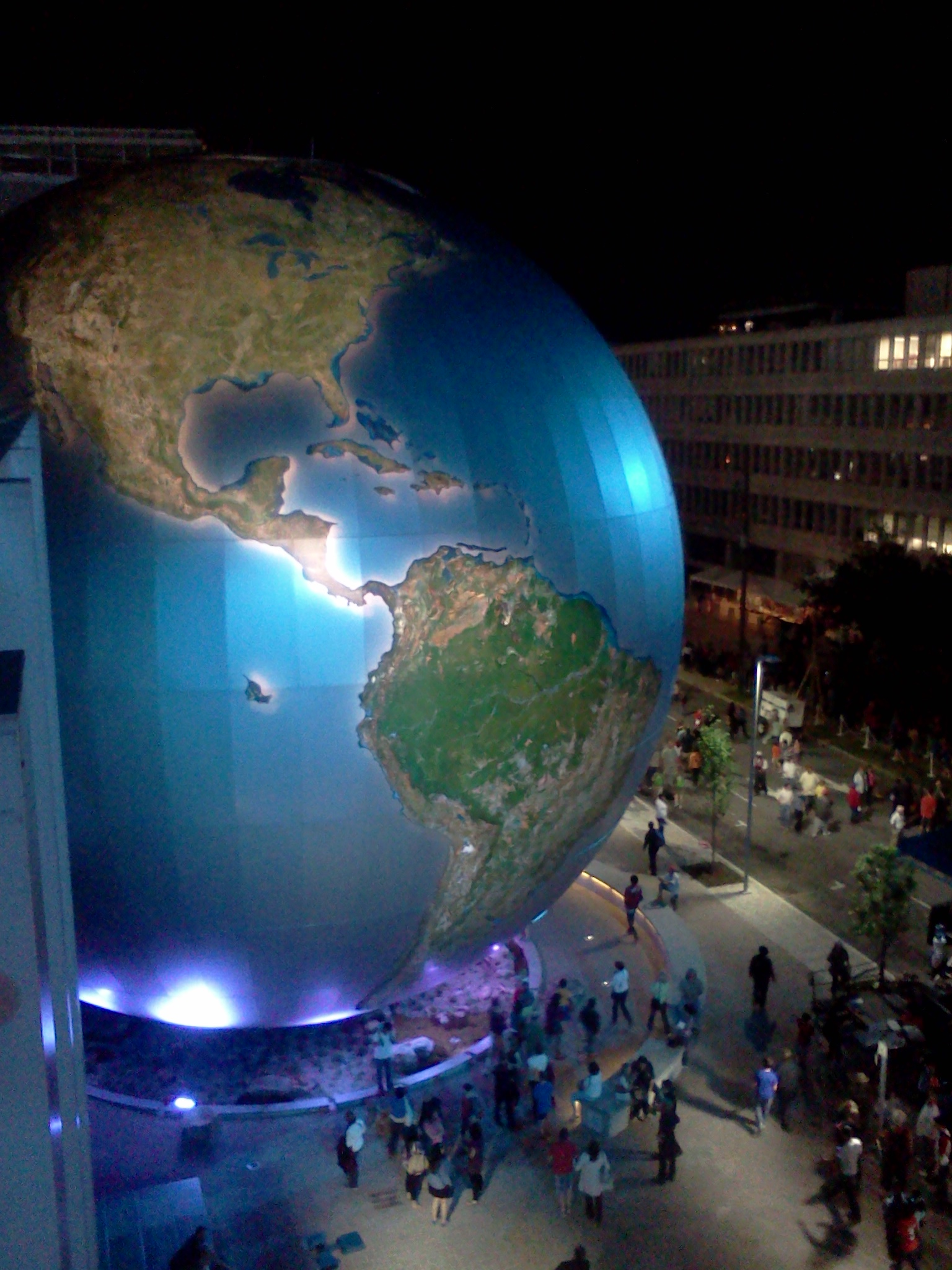
Nature Research Center exterior at night
