= Patterned by Nature =

Artistic installation in Raleigh

Patterned by Nature was commissioned by the North Carolina Museum of Natural Sciences in Raleigh, North Carolina. This piece was a collaboration between Hypersonic, Sosolimited, and Plebian Design. 10 feet wide and 90 feet long, this sculptural ribbon winds through the five-story atrium of the newly built Nature Research Center museum expansion. "The exhibit explores how natural complexity can be abstracted into patterns through scientific methods. It brings to light the similarity of patterns in our universe, across all scales of space and time," says Bill Washabaugh, one of the project designers. The ribbon is made of 3,600 tiles of individually dimmable LCD glass, and runs on a total of about 75 watts of power.
