= Daniel Paluska =

Daniel Paluska is an American artist and roboticist known for his computer art installations and collaborations. Paluska is originally from Michigan,. He received both his BS and master's degrees in Mechanical Engineering from MIT where he worked on perfecting the movement of robotic legs. His work on walking robotics was featured in a cover article of Wired Magazine in September, 2000. Paluska is currently the VP of robotics at Pickle Robot, a startup he co-founded in 2018.

With Jeff Lieberman, Paluska created the Absolut Quartet, an interactive music-making machine commissioned by Absolut Vodka. He also collaborated with Amorphic Robotics in 2006 to create the ToteMobile, a transformational sculpture inspired and commissioned by Citroen. Paluska is the proprietor of Brooklyn Mobile, a mobile internet videotelephony booth.
