= List of Time Warp episodes =

This is an episode list of the popular science television program Time Warp, which aired on the Discovery Channel.

== Series overview ==
Season	Episodes	Start date	End date
1	20	March 18, 2008	Unknown
2	11	April 8, 2009	June 24, 2009
3	3	October 14, 2009	October 28, 2009

== Episodes ==
=== Season 1 (2008) ===
No. overall	No. in season	Title	Description	Original air date
0	0	Pilot	An introduction to high-speed cameras, what happens to us when we get punched, how sound waves break glass, and how dogs really drink water.	March 18, 2008
1	1	Stone Breaking	"Breaking stone slabs, Diet Coke and Mentos geysers, Frisbee dog."	October 15, 2008
2	2	Will It Blend?	"Juggling balls to chainsaws, blending things you shouldn't, breaking a beer bottle bare-handed."	October 15, 2008
3	3	Dry Ice Bomb	"Throwing water on a grease fire, the power of dry ice, the wonders of soap bubbles, a tablecloth pull trick."	October 22, 2008
4	4	Fuel Girls	"The Fuel Girls' fiery breath, skateboard champion Greg Lutzka's killer kick flips, and Russ Byars' world record winning stone-skipping technique."	October 22, 2008
5	5	Taser	What happens when you're hit by a taser gun, "how a pole vaulter defies gravity for a record-making jump, and how a jack hammer pounds the pavement...and the body."	October 29, 2008
6	6	Human Crash Dummy	Cameras capture human crash test dummy Rusty Haight as he helps the state police by intentionally crashing his car for science. Two young archers take their best shot William Tell style.	October 29, 2008
7	7	Samurai Sword Master	The secrets behind a samurai swordsman's lethal blow, a pool pro's award-winning moves, and the inner workings of a hummingbird. Plus, the artful side of an accident with tempered glass.	November 5, 2008
8	8	Free Runner	The art and the science behind a gravity-defying free runner, the strange solid liquid non-Newtonian fluid, and the beauty of water droplets.	November 5, 2008
9	9	Bull Whip	The sonic boom of a bull whip, no two wet dogs shake exactly alike, and a Boston Bruins' star puts two hockey sticks to the test.	November 12, 2008
10	10	Liquid Nitrogen	The freezing power of liquid nitrogen, stopping bullets with "Dragon Skin", and lighting up fireworks.	November 12, 2008
11	11	Break-dancing	"The destructive force of power tools, the seemingly physics-bending motions of break-dancing, and why a bullet fired underwater goes askew."	November 19, 2008
12	12	Paintball	Storm-blown glass, make a mess with paintballs, serve up a flaming cocktail with some trick bartenders, and spring into action with the Yo Yo Pros.	November 19, 2008
13	13	Cheerleading	Shoot skeets with an Olympian, capture the airborne acrobatics of Boston College cheerleaders, and find out how a baseball can break a hard baseball bat.	November 26, 2008
14	14	Trial Bikes	The stunts of two urban bike riders, the athletic precision of an ice skater, and the tricks of a cardthrower whose 90 mph focused toss can chop vegetables and put out candles.	November 26, 2008
15	15	Sharpshooter	An Old West Champion Sharpshooter, get cooking with the Feasty Boys, look at things differently with a Schlieren camera, and try their hand at a three-bladed boomerang.	December 3, 2008
16	16	Barefooter	A world-class "barefooter" as he twists and turns across the water without skis, more razor-sharp cutting with a Samurai martial arts expert, a drummer with a world speed record, and Jeff's electrifying new art project.	December 3, 2008
17	17	Stuntmen	What really happens in a movie fight scene, the secret behind bowling a strike, and the noisemakers behind a cicada and a rattlesnake.	December 10, 2008
18	18	Body Modification	The pain of body modification, the energy flow of a Wushu master, quick-stepping tap dancers, and what happens to a firecracker in a wine glass.	December 10, 2008
19	19	Mouse Trap	Trap-testing with Rev. Tommy Gunn and the high-flying Cirque du Soleil, exploring their inner stuntmen, and capturing the sophisticated simplicity of making music and weed-whacking.	December 17, 2008
20	20	Lawn Tools	Putting various items through a lawn mower and wood chipper; Cirque Du Soleil rehearsal.	Unknown

=== Season 2 (2009) ===
No. overall	No. in season	Title	Description	Original air date
21	1	Blades and Volts	The Time Warp team takes to the skies and goes to the edge with chutes, blades and megadoses of electricity in the Season 2 premiere.	April 8, 2009
22	2	Slings, Rockets and Sticks	The Time Warp team gets into the swing of things with a medieval catapult, rockets, and the fine art of stick fighting.	April 15, 2009
23	3	Air Bags, Sparks, Ropes and Rings	Air bags put to the test; kitchen disasters re-created; the anatomy of sparks revealed; champion rope jumpers and real wrestling.	April 22, 2009
24	4	Heavy Metal, Motorcross and Chain Saws (a.k.a. Metallica)	Metallica band members and heavy metal legends get "warped." A chainsaw artist chews things up and down and dirty with dirt bikes. The team turns it up to 11 with Metallica.	April 29, 2009
25	5	Splashes, Guns and Bikes	Darren "Professor Splash" Taylor takes the plunge. Having a blast with vintage machine guns. Plus, hanging 10 with a motorcycle surfer.	May 6, 2009
26	6	Snakes, Sumo and Bocks	Up close with deadly snakes; the Boston Fire Department fires things up; a throwdown with sumo wrestlers and jumping with powerbockers.	May 13, 2009
27	7	Goop, Goo, Glop and Germs	Bathroom dangers; the world of water drops; the way germs spread; Feasty Boys and Zoz Brooks prepare meals, and competitive eaters chow down.	May 27, 2009
28	8	Arrows, Dogs, Strong Men and Yo-Yos	A martial arts expert catches arrows barehanded; champion dogs show off; professional strongmen perform feats of strength; and a supersized yo-yo.	June 3, 2009
29	9	Hot Stuff and Cold Steel	Military weapons and awesome firepower; seeing how household items can be used as weapons. Pyro-technicians perform amazing feats with fire.	June 10, 2009
30	10	Las Vegas: Warped	Penn and Teller show a few tricks of their trade; the Fuel Girls demonstrate amazing new fire stunts; a behind-the-scenes tour of Cirque du Soleil's "O."	June 17, 2009
31	11	Big Cats and Mixed Martial Arts	The power of very big cats; mixed martial arts champions perform; Zoz Brooks experiments with "instant science"; magicians Dan Buck and Dave Buck share a few card tricks and show you how to cheat at playing cards.	June 24, 2009

=== Season 3 (2009) ===
No. overall	No. in season	Title	Description	Original air date
32	1	Coasters, Cars, Cups and Cans	Riding one of the tallest roller coasters; Car stunts performed; Kid sport stacking champions; Paddleball champion plays; Steel tanker crushed.	October 14, 2009
33	2	Blue Men, Propellers, Big Bangs and Viewer Requests	Blue Man Group visits. The realm of fluid dynamics. The science of propellers. Viewer requests.	October 21, 2009
34	3	Car Crushing, Lumber Jacks and Skateboards	A car-crushing machine is tested; magnets are used to induce collisions; a lesson in lumberjacking; skateboard legend Danny Way gets ramped up.	October 28, 2009
