= List of roboticists =

This is a list of roboticists, noted for their contributions to the field of robotics.

== A ==
- Pieter Abbeel – Belgian-American roboticist specializing in robot learning and artificial intelligence
- Eneni Abban – robotics engineer and STEM communicator
- Silas Adekunle – Nigerian-British robotics engineer and co-founder of Reach Robotics
- Alice Agogino – American engineer and roboticist
- Sunil K. Agrawal – Indian-American roboticist specializing in rehabilitation robotics and exoskeletons
- James S. Albus (1935–2011) – American roboticist known for intelligent control systems
- Colin Angle – American roboticist and co-founder of iRobot
- Ronald C. Arkin – American roboticist specializing in autonomous robots
- Christopher G. Atkeson – American roboticist specializing in humanoid robotics

== B ==
- Ruzena Bajcsy – Slovak-American roboticist specializing in computer vision and robotics
- Jean-Christophe Baillie – French roboticist and artificial intelligence researcher
- Timothy D. Barfoot – Canadian roboticist specializing in autonomous navigation
- Kira Barton – American roboticist specializing in advanced manufacturing
- Randall Beer – American roboticist specializing in biologically inspired robotics and artificial life
- George A. Bekey (1928–2017) – American roboticist and researcher in autonomous systems
- James Bellingham – American roboticist specializing in autonomous underwater vehicles
- Maren Bennewitz – German roboticist specializing in mobile robots
- Sarah Bergbreiter – American roboticist specializing in miniature robots
- Carlotta Berry – American roboticist and engineering educator
- Antonio Bicchi – Italian roboticist specializing in robot manipulation
- Aude Billard – Swiss roboticist specializing in robot learning
- Trevor Blackwell – Canadian-American roboticist and developer of humanoid robots
- Dominik Boesl – German roboticist specializing in robotics and artificial intelligence
- Johann Borenstein – Israeli-American roboticist specializing in mobile robot navigation
- Danielle Boyer – American robotics inventor and educator
- Cynthia Breazeal – American roboticist and pioneer of social robotics
- Roger W. Brockett (1938–2023) – American control theorist and founder of the Harvard Robotics Laboratory
- Alberto Broggi – Italian roboticist specializing in autonomous vehicles
- Rodney Brooks – Australian roboticist and co-founder of iRobot and Rethink Robotics
- Mireille Broucke – Canadian engineer specializing in control theory and swarm robotics
- Wolfram Burgard – German roboticist specializing in autonomous mobile robots
- Jessica Burgner-Kahrs – German-Canadian roboticist specializing in continuum robots

== C ==
- Darwin Caldwell – British roboticist specializing in humanoid, haptic, and rehabilitation robotics
- Raja Chatila – French-Syrian roboticist specializing in autonomous and intelligent robots
- Marita Cheng – Australian roboticist and founder of Aubot
- Christine Chevallereau – French roboticist specializing in bipedal locomotion and humanoid robots
- Gregory S. Chirikjian – American roboticist specializing in robot motion and control
- Margarita Chli – Cypriot roboticist specializing in robot vision
- Howie Choset – American roboticist specializing in snake robots and motion planning
- Henrik I. Christensen – Danish-American roboticist specializing in autonomous systems
- Reymond Clavel – Swiss roboticist known for inventing the Delta robot
- Nikolaus Correll – German-American roboticist specializing in swarm robotics and robotic materials
- Peter Corke – Australian roboticist specializing in robot vision and robotics software
- Armin B. Cremers – German computer scientist whose research includes artificial intelligence and robotics
- Elizabeth Croft – Canadian roboticist specializing in human-robot interaction
- Catie Cuan – American roboticist and choreographer specializing in human-robot interaction
- Leanne Cushing – American mechanical engineer and roboticist known for combat robotics

== D ==
- Raffaello D'Andrea – roboticist known for autonomous drones and co-founding Kiva Systems
- Frank Dellaert – Belgian-American roboticist specializing in robot perception, computer vision, and simultaneous localization and mapping
- Jaydev P. Desai – Indian-American roboticist specializing in medical and surgical robotics
- George Devol (1912–2011) – American inventor who developed the first programmable industrial robot
- Ernst Dickmanns – German roboticist and pioneer of autonomous vehicles
- Arsh Shah Dilbagi – Indian inventor and robotics researcher
- Rüdiger Dillmann – German roboticist specializing in humanoid and service robots
- Hugh F. Durrant-Whyte – Australian roboticist specializing in autonomous systems and sensor fusion

== E ==
- Magnus Egerstedt – Swedish-American roboticist specializing in multi-robot systems
- Joseph Engelberger (1925–2015) – American engineer known as the father of robotics
- Ryan M. Eustice – American roboticist specializing in autonomous vehicles

== F ==
- Shane Farritor – American roboticist specializing in surgical and miniature robots
- Chelsea Finn – American roboticist specializing in robot learning
- Peer Fischer – German roboticist specializing in micro and nanorobotics
- Dario Floreano – Italian-Swiss roboticist specializing in evolutionary robotics
- Pat Fothergill (1936–2017) – British roboticist and pioneer of robot control languages
- Dieter Fox – German-American roboticist specializing in robot perception and navigation
- Udo Frese – German roboticist specializing in robot navigation and simultaneous localization and mapping
- Masakatsu Fujie – Japanese roboticist specializing in medical robotics

== G ==
- Elena García Armada – Spanish roboticist known for developing robotic exoskeletons
- Ryan Gariepy – Canadian robotics engineer and co-founder of Clearpath Robotics
- Simone Giertz – Swedish inventor and robotics creator known for building unconventional robots
- Maria L. Gini – Italian-American roboticist specializing in multi-agent systems
- Raymond Goertz (1915–1970) – American engineer and pioneer of remotely operated robotic manipulators
- Ken Goldberg – American roboticist specializing in robot manipulation and automation
- Steve Grand – British roboticist and computer scientist known for artificial life and humanoid robotics
- Robert D. Gregg – American roboticist specializing in wearable robots and locomotion control
- Helen Greiner – American roboticist and co-founder of iRobot
- Roderic Grupen – American roboticist specializing in autonomous and dexterous robots
- André Guignard – Swiss roboticist known for the development of mobile robots

== H ==
- Ernest Lenard Hall – American robotic engineer specializing in intelligent robots and computer vision
- David Hanson – American roboticist and founder of Hanson Robotics
- Sabine Hauert – Swiss-British roboticist specializing in swarm robotics
- Vincent Hayward – French-Canadian roboticist specializing in haptics
- Hugh Herr – American roboticist specializing in biomechatronics and robotic prostheses
- Gerd Hirzinger – German roboticist known for space robotics and lightweight robot arms
- Shigeo Hirose – Japanese roboticist known for developing snake and walking robots
- Jessica Hodgins – American roboticist specializing in humanoid motion
- John M. Hollerbach – American roboticist specializing in robot control and haptics
- Dennis Hong – Korean-American roboticist specializing in humanoid and mobile robots
- Ayanna Howard – American roboticist specializing in artificial intelligence and assistive robotics
- Seth A. Hutchinson – roboticist specializing in robot planning, sensing, and control

== I ==
- Takashi Ikegami – Japanese researcher specializing in artificial life and robotics
- Grant Imahara (1970–2020) – American engineer and roboticist
- Seiuemon Inaba (1925–2020) – Japanese roboticist and industrial automation pioneer
- Hiroshi Ishiguro – Japanese roboticist known for developing humanoid androids
- Serena Ivaldi – Italian roboticist specializing in humanoid robotics and human-robot interaction

== J ==
- Ali Jadbabaie – Iranian-American systems scientist known for research on multi-robot coordination
- Stephen Jacobsen – American engineer and roboticist known for robotic and exoskeleton systems
- Matthew Johnson-Roberson – American roboticist specializing in autonomous systems and robot perception
- Wendy Ju – American roboticist specializing in human-robot interaction

== K ==
- Leslie P. Kaelbling – American roboticist specializing in artificial intelligence and robot learning
- Takeo Kanade – Japanese roboticist specializing in computer vision and autonomous systems
- Robert Katzschmann – German roboticist specializing in soft robotics
- Homayoon Kazerooni – Iranian-American roboticist known for developing robotic exoskeletons
- Oussama Khatib – Syrian-American roboticist specializing in robot control
- Sven Koenig – German-American roboticist specializing in artificial intelligence and robot planning
- Danica Kragic – Swedish roboticist specializing in computer vision and robot manipulation
- Katherine Kuchenbecker – American roboticist specializing in haptics
- James J. Kuffner Jr. – American roboticist known for motion planning and autonomous vehicles
- Vijay Kumar – roboticist specializing in multi-robot systems and autonomous vehicles
- Hanna Kurniawati – Indonesian-Australian roboticist specializing in robot planning under uncertainty

== L ==
- Cecilia Laschi – Italian roboticist specializing in soft robotics
- Corinna E. Lathan – American engineer and roboticist specializing in human-machine interaction
- Jean-Claude Latombe – French-American roboticist specializing in robot motion planning
- Jean-Paul Laumond (1953–2021) – French roboticist specializing in robot motion planning
- Claude Laurgeau – French roboticist specializing in intelligent vehicles and automation
- Steven M. LaValle – American roboticist specializing in motion planning
- Dave Lavery – American roboticist known for work on planetary and space robotics
- Jade Le Maître – French robotics engineer and science communicator
- John J. Leonard – American roboticist specializing in autonomous navigation
- Angelica Lim – Canadian roboticist specializing in social robotics and artificial intelligence
- Hod Lipson – Israeli-American roboticist specializing in self-reconfiguring and autonomous robots
- Tomás Lozano-Pérez – Spanish-American roboticist specializing in robot motion planning

== M ==
- Alcherio Martinoli – Swiss roboticist specializing in swarm robotics
- Matthew T. Mason – American roboticist specializing in robot manipulation
- Maja Matarić – Serbian-American roboticist specializing in socially assistive robotics
- Yoky Matsuoka – Japanese-American roboticist specializing in neurobotics
- James McLurkin – American roboticist specializing in swarm robotics
- Gyula Mester – roboticist specializing in mobile robots and intelligent systems
- Robert C. Michelson – American roboticist known for developing the entomopter
- Catherine Mohr – American roboticist specializing in surgical robotics
- Francesco Mondada – Swiss roboticist known for mobile and educational robots
- Ajung Moon – Korean-Canadian roboticist specializing in robot ethics and human-robot interaction
- Hans Moravec – Canadian roboticist and artificial intelligence researcher
- Masahiro Mori – Japanese roboticist known for proposing the uncanny valley
- Robin Murphy – American roboticist specializing in disaster robotics

== N ==
- Radhika Nagpal – Indian-American roboticist specializing in swarm robotics
- Bradley Nelson – American-Swiss roboticist specializing in micro- and nanorobotics
- Stefano Nolfi – Italian roboticist specializing in evolutionary robotics
- Peter Nordin – Swedish computer scientist and roboticist known for evolutionary robotics

== O ==
- Reza Olfati-Saber – Iranian-American engineer specializing in multi-agent and robotic systems
- Edwin Olson – American roboticist specializing in autonomous vehicles and robot perception
- Mark Overmars – Dutch roboticist and computer scientist

== P ==
- Jamie Paik – Canadian-Swiss roboticist specializing in reconfigurable and soft robots
- Maja Pantić – Serbian computer scientist whose research includes human-robot interaction
- Rolf Pfeifer – Swiss roboticist and cognitive scientist known for embodied intelligence
- Donald L. Pieper – American roboticist known for research on robot manipulator kinematics
- François Pierrot – French roboticist known for developing parallel robots
- Nancy Pollard – American roboticist specializing in robot manipulation
- Robin Popplestone (1938–2004) – British computer scientist and pioneer of robot programming
- Domenico Prattichizzo – Italian roboticist specializing in haptics and robotic manipulation

== R ==
- Nic Radford – American roboticist known for humanoid and space robotics
- Marc Raibert – American roboticist and founder of Boston Dynamics
- Ragunathan Rajkumar – Indian-American engineer specializing in autonomous and cyber-physical systems
- Alexander Reben – American roboticist and artist
- Raj Reddy – Indian-American computer scientist and robotics researcher
- Carol E. Reiley – American roboticist specializing in medical and autonomous robotics
- Isabel Ribeiro – Portuguese roboticist specializing in mobile robotics and control
- Jacob Rubinovitz – Israeli engineer specializing in industrial robotics and automation
- Elliott J. Rouse – American roboticist specializing in wearable robotics and prostheses
- Daniela Rus – Romanian-American roboticist specializing in distributed and autonomous robots

== S ==
- John Kenneth Salisbury Jr. – American roboticist specializing in robot manipulation, teleoperation, and haptics
- Shankar Sastry – Indian-American engineer specializing in robotics and control
- Ashutosh Saxena – roboticist specializing in robot learning and perception
- Davide Scaramuzza – Italian-Swiss roboticist specializing in autonomous drones
- Stefan Schaal – German-American roboticist specializing in robot learning
- Victor Scheinman (1942–2016) – American roboticist who developed the Stanford arm
- Angela Schoellig – German-Canadian roboticist specializing in autonomous systems
- Homayoun Seraji (1947–2007) – Iranian-American roboticist specializing in robot control and space robotics
- Noel Sharkey – British computer scientist and roboticist known for robotics and robot ethics
- Thomas B. Sheridan – American engineer known for research in telerobotics and human-machine systems
- Roland Siegwart – Swiss roboticist specializing in autonomous mobile robots
- David Silver – American roboticist specializing in autonomous mobile robots
- Metin Sitti – Turkish roboticist specializing in miniature and bio-inspired robots
- Mark W. Spong – American roboticist specializing in robot control
- Maarten Steinbuch – Dutch roboticist and control engineer
- Cynthia Sung – American roboticist specializing in computational robot design
- Hartmut Surmann – German roboticist specializing in mobile and rescue robots
- Katia Sycara – Greek-American roboticist specializing in multi-agent and autonomous systems

== T ==
- Tomotaka Takahashi – Japanese roboticist known for designing humanoid robots
- Leila Takayama – American roboticist specializing in human-robot interaction
- Seth Teller (1964–2014) – American computer scientist whose research included robotics, computer vision, and sensor networks
- Andrea L. Thomaz – American roboticist specializing in human-robot interaction
- Sebastian Thrun – German-American roboticist and pioneer of autonomous vehicles
- Mark Tilden – Canadian roboticist known for developing biomorphic robots
- Rajko Tomović (1919–2001) – Serbian roboticist known for developing robotic hands
- Jocelyne Troccaz – French roboticist specializing in medical robotics and image-guided surgery

== U ==
- Galip Ulsoy – Turkish-American engineer whose research includes robot and mechanical-system control
- Umeda Mikio – Japanese roboticist specializing in agricultural and field robotics

== V ==
- Hendrik Van Brussel – Belgian engineer specializing in robotics, mechatronics, and manufacturing automation
- Manuela M. Veloso – Portuguese-American roboticist specializing in autonomous and multi-robot systems
- Miomir Vukobratović (1931–2012) – Serbian roboticist and pioneer of humanoid locomotion

== W ==
- William Grey Walter (1910–1977) – American-British roboticist who developed early autonomous robots
- Wang Xingxing – Chinese roboticist and founder of Unitree Robotics
- Kevin Warwick – British engineer and roboticist known for cybernetics and robotics
- Barbara Webb – British roboticist specializing in biologically inspired robotics
- Gil Weinberg – Israeli-American roboticist known for developing robotic musicians
- Red Whittaker – American roboticist known for autonomous vehicles and field robotics
- Mary-Anne Williams – Australian roboticist and artificial intelligence researcher specializing in cognitive robotics
- Lisa Winter – American engineer and roboticist known for combat robotics
- Helen Chan Wolf – American roboticist and computer scientist known for early artificial intelligence and robotics research
- Robert Wood – American roboticist specializing in miniature and bio-inspired robots

== X ==
- Yangsheng Xu – Chinese roboticist specializing in space robotics, service robotics, and intelligent systems

== Y ==
- Holly Yanco – American roboticist specializing in human-robot interaction

== Z ==
- Alex Zelinsky – Australian roboticist specializing in mobile robotics and computer vision
- Zhang Libin – Chinese roboticist specializing in agricultural and industrial robotics

== See also ==
- American roboticists
- List of emerging technologies
- List of robots
- List of robotic dogs
- List of robotics companies
- List of robotics laboratories
- List of robotics occupations
- List of robotics software
- Lists of engineers
- Physical artificial intelligence
- Roboticists by nationality
