= Kragić =

Kragić or Kragic is a Serbo-Croatian surname. Notable people with the surname include:

- Danica Kragic (born c. 1971), Swedish engineer and university professor
- Jerko Marinić Kragić (born 1991), Croatian water polo player
- Vladimir Kragić (1910–1975), Croatian footballer
