= Renovell Nichel =

Renovell Nichel from the LIRMM-CNRS, Montpellier Cedex, Herault, France was named Fellow of the Institute of Electrical and Electronics Engineers (IEEE) in 2013 for contributions to failure analysis and to defect-oriented tests of digital and analog circuits and systems.
