= KCD =

KCD or kcd may refer to:

== Educational institutions ==
- Karnatak College Dharwar, India
- Kentucky Country Day School, US
- Khyber College of Dentistry, Pakistan

== Other uses ==
- kilocandela (kcd), 1000 candela
- Kincardineshire, Scotland (by Chapman code)
- Kineo Collision Detector, a software library
- Kingdom Come: Deliverance, a 2018 video game
