= Mick Mountz =

American entrepreneur (born 1965)

Michael C. "Mick" Mountz (born May 5, 1965) is an American entrepreneur. He is the founder and CEO of Kiva Systems, which makes order fulfillment systems using mobile robots for warehouse automation. The company was bought by Amazon.com in March 2012.

He is an MIT (1987) and Harvard (1996) alumnus, and part of the MIT Deans Advisory Committee for the School of Engineering.

In 2008, Mountz won the IEEE/IFR Innovation and Entrepreneurship Award along with Kiva co-founders Peter Wurman and Raffaello D’Andrea, as well as the Ernst & Young Entrepreneur of the Year Award in the New England region.

== Life ==
Mick was born in Frankfurt, West Germany. He received a Bachelor of Science in Mechanical Engineering from MIT in 1987, and in 1996 he received an MBA from Harvard University.

== Early career ==
Mountz’s started his career as a manufacturing engineer at Motorola in 1987 where he worked for 7 years. In 1995, he joined Apple Inc. as a product marketing manager, working on Power Mac, FireWire, DVD and Gigabit Ethernet.

After leaving Apple in 1999, he started working at online grocery platform Webvan as the business process director for logistics. Though the company filed for bankruptcy and shut down not long after in 2001, Mountz credits his time at Webvan with giving him insights on how challenging and inefficient order fulfillment was.

== Kiva Systems ==
In 2003, Mountz founded Kiva Systems with co-founders Peter Wurman and Raffaello D’Andrea. He led the company as the CEO until 2015. In 2009, under Mountz’s leadership, Kiva was ranked #6 on the Inc. 500 list of the fastest-growing companies in America, and Gartner named Kiva one of its “Cool Vendors in Supply Chain Management.” Kiva Systems sold to Amazon in 2012, and was rebranded to Amazon Robotics in 2015. At the end of 2015, Mountz left Amazon Robotics.

== Boards ==
Since 2016, Mountz has been part of the funding board for the MIT Sandbox Innovation Fund, which provides seed funding for student-initiated entrepreneurship ideas. In 2018, Mountz joined robotic piece-picking company RightHand Robotics as a board member after a $23M Series B funding round. In addition, he is a board advisor for retail drone company Pensa Systems, and autonomous indoor drone company Verity

== Awards and honors ==
- 2009 Kiva Systems – #6 Inc. Fastest Growing Companies in America
- 2009 Kiva Systems – Cool Vendors in Supply Chain Management
- 2008 IEEE/IFR Invention and Entrepreneurship Award
- 2008 Ernst & Young Entrepreneur of the Year Award in the New England region
- 2020 National Inventors Hall of Fame Inductee
- 2021 Member of the National Academy of Engineering
