= Laschi =

Laschi is an Italian surname. Notable people with the surname include:

- Cecilia Laschi (born 1968), Italian roboticist
- Luisa Laschi (c. 1760–c. 1790), Italian operatic soprano
