= Bradley Nelson =

American roboticist

Bradley James Nelson
- Born: 16 May 1962 (age 64); Murphysboro, Illinois
- Citizenship: Switzerland, United States of America
- Education: Carnegie Mellon University
- Awards: 2019 IEEE RAS Pioneer Award, IEEE Robotics and Automation Society
- Scientific career
- Fields: Robotics
- Workplaces: ETH Zurich
- Website: msrl.ethz.ch

Bradley James Nelson (born 16 May 1962) is an American roboticist and entrepreneur. He has been the Professor of Robotics and Intelligent Systems at ETH Zurich since 2002 and is known for his research in microrobotics, nanorobotics, and medical robotics.

In 2005, Nelson was chosen as one of Scientific American's top 50 leaders in science and technology for his work on practical applications of nanotubes. In 2019 he received the IEEE RAS Pioneer Award from the IEEE Robotics and Automation Society, "In recognition of outstanding contributions in micro and nano robotics". He is a co-founder of Aeon Scientific AG, Femtotools AG, OphthoRobotics AG, Magnes AG, Oxyle AG, and MagnebotiX AG.

== Education ==
- Ph.D. in robotics (Robotics Institute, School of Computer Science), Carnegie Mellon University, 1995
- M.S. in Mechanical Engineering, University of Minnesota, 1987
- B.S. in Mechanical Engineering, University of Illinois Urbana-Champaign, 1984, University Honors/Bronze Tablet.

== Career ==
Nelson held positions at Motorola and at Honeywell, and served with the United States Peace Corps in Botswana, Southern Africa. After earning his Ph.D. from Carnegie Mellon University in 1995, Nelson became an assistant professor at the University of Illinois at Chicago, He moved to the University of Minnesota as an associate professor in 1998. In 2002 Nelson became a full professor of robotics and intelligent systems at ETH Zürich, Switzerland.

== Research ==
External videos
- "Building Medical Robots, Bacteria sized: Bradley Nelson at TEDxZurich", November 28, 2012, TEDx Talks
- "Bacteria-Sized Robots for Precision Drug Delivery: Bradley Nelson", August 8, 2016, World Economic Forum
- "How can we provide access to surgery for everyone on the planet?: Dr. Bradley Nelson at TEDxSelnau", May 24, 2018, TEDx Talks

Nelson has over thirty years of experience in the field of robotics. He specializes in nanotechnology and the development of microscopic robots for use in medicine and other applications. He is particularly known for his work in developing soft, biologically inspired flexible architectures.

In early research at ETH Zurich, researchers from the Institute of Robotics and Intelligent Systems (IRIS), led by Nelson, developed a robot to play nanosoccer on a field of play the size of a grain of rice. The international RoboCup Nanogram demonstration events were supported by the U.S. National Institute of Standards and Technology (NIST) in 2007, 2008, and 2009. The goal was to develop microrobots that could perform soccer related tasks, as a demonstration of the feasibility of fabricating Microelectromechanical systems (MEMS) on semiconductor chips. Zurich's resonant magnetic robot, or "Magmite", was 300 μm (0.012 in) long and could be driven forward, put into reverse, and turn left and right. Magnetic fields were used to move the robot on a flat surface. ETH Zurich placed first in the 2007 RoboCup Nanogram Competition and was one of two teams to perform successfully in the 2009 competition.

In 2009, Nelson and his research team were recognized by Guinness World Records for creating the "most advanced mini robot for medical use", a robot about 20 μm (0.00079 in) long with swirling flagella, constructed of semiconductor materials and controlled by a magnetic field. Like a number of Nelson's robots, the rod-shaped microrobot was inspired by a biological form, in this case Escherichia coli bacteria. Magnetic fields are used to affect the orientation of the robot's "flagella", causing it to move. External magnetic fields are generated using eight electromagnets which allow the operator of the microrobot to move it along the x, y and z-axes in any desired direction. Development of nanoelectromechanical systems (NEMS) can require novel materials and may involve unique effects which occur at a nanoscale, Nelson's rod-shaped robots required the development of a material that would be highly sensitive to magnetic fields, made by combining the elements cobalt and samarium.

Such robots have been tested within the vitreous humor of the eye to deliver drugs to the retina. Microrobots have also been specialized to report oxygen levels in the retina by releasing a fluorescent dye that fades at a rate that indicates the presence of oxygen. Other possible areas that have been suggested for medical applications include the heart, urinary tract, small intestine and the brain, which are difficult to reach. Water treatment and environmental cleanup are also possible application areas where nanobots could be used.

The use of specialized 3-D printers makes it possible to develop new types of materials for use in microrobots such as polymers. As of 2015, Nelson and Christofer Hierold collaborated to develop a robot made from a biocompatible biopolymer that can dissolve in the body once the robot's task is completed.

In collaboration with a team led by Selman Sakar of the Ecole Polytechnique Federale de Lausanne (EPFL), Nelson's team has developed soft-architecture microswimmer robots whose design incorporates folding techniques similar to Japanese origami. The design mimics the ability of micro-organisms to change shape in response to changing environmental conditions. The robot is made up of a multilayered structure of various hydrogels, which respond differentially to environmental conditions such as pH, temperature, or light. In response to such changes, the biopolymers expand or contract, causing the robot to change shape. The design was inspired by Trypanosoma brucei bacterium, the cause of sleeping sickness. The bacterium has a long narrow shape for moving through bodily fluids and a stubby, compact shape which it reaches its target area.

In collaboration with Daniel Ahmed of ETH Zurich, Nelson has developed magnetic beads whose movement can be guided against a fluid current. The beads are made of a hydrogel nanocomposite containing particles of iron oxide and a polymer. Each bead has a diameter of 3 μm (0.00012 in). A "swarm" or cluster of beads between 15 μm (0.00059 in) and 40 μm (0.0016 in) micrometres wide can be guided with a magnetic controller. Bead swarms have been studied using liquid-filled glass tubes to similulate the types of conditions that might be found in blood vessels 150 μm (0.0059 in) to 300 μm (0.012 in) micrometres thick. In the same way that someone travelling up a river might hug the banks where the current is slower, the scientists operating the microbeads keep them near the sides of the glass tubes. They use ultrasound to move the microbead cluster toward the wall of the tube, and a rotating magnetic field to move the swarm against the current.

Nelson's microrobotic systems have also been used by Hannes Vogler, Ueli Grossniklaus and other researchers in the Department of Plant and Microbial Biology at Zurich to study the trapping mechanism of Venus flytrap (Dionaea muscipula). Researchers discovered a previously unknown mechanism by which the plant traps prey, with a single slow touch triggering the fly trap to close. They were able to mathematically model the angular deflection and velocity thresholds involved in the snapping mechanism.

== Honors and awards ==
Nelson has received a number of awards for his work in robotics, nanotechnology and biomedicine.

- 2026 American Institute for Medical and Biological Engineering
- 2020 Grand Hamdan International Award - AI in Healthcare
- 2020 Sheikh Hamdan bin Rashid Al Maktoum Award for Medical Sciences
- 2019 IEEE RAS Pioneer Award, IEEE Robotics and Automation Society, "In recognition of outstanding contributions in micro and nano robotics"
- 2016 European Research Council Advanced Grant (Soft Micro Robotics, or SOMBOT)
- 2014 First Place: Mobile MicroRobot Challenge, ICRA
- 2012 Guinness Book of World Records for "Most Advanced Mini Robot for Medical Use."
- 2011 European Research Council Advanced Grant (Microrobotics and Nanomedicine, BOTMED)
- 2011 IEEE Fellow, IEEE Robotics & Automation Magazine
- 2010 ASME Fellow, American Society of Mechanical Engineers
- 2009 ETH Zurich Team, First Place: RoboCup Nanogram Soccer
- 2007 ETH Zurich Team, First Place: RoboCup Nanogram Soccer
- 2005 Scientific American 50: SA 50 Winners and Contributors, Scientific American
- 1999 McKnight Land-Grant Professorship in Mechanical engineering, University of Minnesota

== Bibliography ==
=== Books ===
- Zhang, Mingjun; Nelson, Bradley; Felder, Robin, eds. (2007). Life science automation fundamentals and applications. Boston: Artech House. ISBN 978-1-59693-105-3.

=== Papers ===
Nelson's research group has won more than a dozen best paper awards at various international conferences and in international journals. Paper awards given are indicated after the citation information.

- Hu, Chengzhi; Pané, Salvador; Nelson, Bradley J. (28 May 2018). "Soft Micro- and Nanorobotics". Annual Review of Control, Robotics, and Autonomous Systems. 1 (1): 53–75. doi:10.1146/annurev-control-060117-104947. hdl:20.500.11850/316345. S2CID 139844553.
- Huang, Hen-Wei; Sakar, Mahmut Selman; Petruska, Andrew J.; Pané, Salvador; Nelson, Bradley J. (November 2016). "Soft micromachines with programmable motility and morphology". Nature Communications. 7 (1) 12263. Bibcode:2016NatCo...712263H. doi:10.1038/ncomms12263. PMC 5512624. PMID 27447088.
- Marino, Hamal; Bergeles, Christos; Nelson, Bradley J. (January 2014). "Robust Electromagnetic Control of Microrobots Under Force and Localization Uncertainties". IEEE Transactions on Automation Science and Engineering. 11 (1): 310–316. doi:10.1109/TASE.2013.2265135. hdl:10044/1/13177. S2CID 17729837. - 2015 T-ASE Best New Application Paper Award, IEEE CASE
- Ullrich, F.; Schuerle, S.; Pieters, R.; Dishy, A.; Michels, S.; Nelson, B. J. (June 6, 2014). "Automated capsulorhexis based on a hybrid magnetic-mechanical actuation system". Proc. IEEE Int. Conf. Robotics Automation, Hong Kong, China. pp. 4387–4392. - Best Paper Award in medical robotics at ICRA 2014
- *Petit, Tristan; Zhang, Li; Peyer, Kathrin E.; Kratochvil, Bradley E.; Nelson, Bradley J. (11 January 2012). "Selective Trapping and Manipulation of Microscale Objects Using Mobile Microvortices". Nano Letters. 12 (1): 156–160. Bibcode:2012NanoL..12..156P. doi:10.1021/nl2032487. PMID 22111870. - 2013 Journal of Laboratory Automation Ten Award, JALA Ten
- Tottori, Soichiro; Zhang, Li; Qiu, Famin; Krawczyk, Krzysztof K.; Franco-Obregón, Alfredo; Nelson, Bradley J. (7 February 2012). "Magnetic Helical Micromachines: Fabrication, Controlled Swimming, and Cargo Transport". Advanced Materials. 24 (6): 811–816. Bibcode:2012AdM....24..811T. doi:10.1002/adma.201103818. PMID 22213276. S2CID 205242976.
- Nelson, Bradley J.; Kaliakatsos, Ioannis K.; Abbott, Jake J. (July 2010). "Microrobots for Minimally Invasive Medicine". Annual Review of Biomedical Engineering. 12 (1): 55–85. doi:10.1146/annurev-bioeng-010510-103409. PMID 20415589.
- Zhang, Li; Abbott, Jake J.; Dong, Lixin; Kratochvil, Bradley E.; Bell, Dominik; Nelson, Bradley J. (9 February 2009). "Artificial bacterial flagella: Fabrication and magnetic control". Applied Physics Letters. 94 (6): 064107. Bibcode:2009ApPhL..94f4107Z. doi:10.1063/1.3079655.
- Dong, Lixin; Nelson, Bradley J.; Fukuda, Toshio; Arai, Fumihito; Nakajima, Masahiro (2006). "Toward Nanotube Linear Servomotors". 3 (3): 228–235. - 2014 Best Medical Robotics Paper Award, ICRA

== See also ==
- Raffaello D'Andrea
- Roland Siegwart
- Vijay Kumar (roboticist)
