= Davide Scaramuzza =

Italian roboticist

- Born: 2 April 1980 (age 46); Terni, Umbria, Italy
- Education: ETH Zurich
- Known for: visual odometry, Simultaneous localization and mapping, event cameras, Unmanned aerial vehicle
- Awards: ERC Consolidator Grant (2019); IEEE Robotics and Automation Society Early Career Award (2014); Google Faculty Research Award (2014); European Young Researcher Award (2012); Misha Mahowald Prize for Neuromorphic Engineering (2017)
- Scientific career
- Fields: Mobile Robotics, Drones, Computer vision
- Workplaces: EPFL Lausanne; ETH Zurich; Stanford University; University of Zurich
- Academic advisors: Roland Siegwart
- Website: Davide Scaramuzza

Davide Scaramuzza (born 2 April 1980) is an Italian roboticist and computer vision researcher. He is a professor of robotics and perception at the University of Zurich and the founding director of the university's Robotics and Perception Group (RPG). His work is primarily focused on vision-based perception and control for autonomous aerial vehicles, event-based cameras, and agile robotic navigation. He is also a co-founder of Zurich Eye (later acquired by Meta Platforms), which contributed to the inside-out tracking technology used in the Oculus Quest virtual reality headset. In 2025, he became a Distinguished Visiting Scientist at NASA Jet Propulsion Laboratory, working on vision-based navigation for lunar and Mars missions.

== Education ==
Scaramuzza was born in Terni, Italy. He studied electronics and information engineering at the University of Perugia, graduating summa cum laude in 2004. His thesis received the Italian Federcomin Award from the Ministry of Innovation. He earned his Ph.D. in robotics and computer vision from ETH Zurich in 2008, under the supervision of Roland Siegwart. His doctoral work on omnidirectional vision and mobile robot navigation won the Robotdalen Scientific Award and was a finalist for the George Giralt Ph.D. Award.

== Career ==
After postdoctoral research at ETH Zurich and the GRASP Laboratory at the University of Pennsylvania, where he worked with Vijay Kumar and Kostas Daniilidis, Scaramuzza joined the University of Zurich in 2012 as an assistant professor. He became a tenured professor in 2017 and founded the Master's program in Artificial Intelligence at UZH in 2021. He held visiting positions at Stanford University and has collaborated extensively with research institutions including MIT, Caltech, Max Planck Institute for Intelligent Systems, and INRIA. In 2025, he was appointed Distinguished Visiting Scientist at NASA's Jet Propulsion Laboratory, contributing to autonomous vision systems for the Cadre and Endurance lunar missions and the Mars Science Helicopter.

Scaramuzza's research has appeared in The New York Times, BBC News, la Repubblica, and Neue Zürcher Zeitung, MIT Technology Review, Wired, and IEEE Spectrum.

== Entrepreneurial work ==
Scaramuzza co-founded several companies and startups in robotics and computer vision. Zurich Eye, founded in 2015, became Meta Zurich, employing over 400 people and developing inside-out tracking for Oculus VR headsets. He co-founded SUIND, a startup building vision-based drones for precision agriculture, and advised Fotokite (tethered drones for first responders) and Dacuda (later acquired by Magic Leap).

== Research ==
=== Event-based vision for low-latency perception ===
Scaramuzza is regarded as one of the pioneers of event-based vision, a neuromorphic sensing paradigm for event cameras, in which pixels respond asynchronously to brightness changes rather than recording full image frames. His group introduced the first algorithms for event-based visual odometry, corner detection, tracking, and SLAM. Later work developed asynchronous convolutional and graph neural networks for scene understanding with sub-millisecond latency.

Applications from his lab include drones that recover from motor failure by relying on event-based sensing, dodging fast moving objects with reaction times of 3.5 milliseconds, and 5,000 Hz detection of traffic participants at the bandwidth of a 50 Hz standard camera.

Scaramuzza's group also created foundational resources such as the ESIM event camera simulator and annotated datasets for autonomous driving, such as DSEC. The field has since grown into a mainstream area at CVPR, ICCV, and ECCV, and has influenced major industrial investments by Sony, Samsung, Huawei, Apple, Meta, and OmniVision. In 2021, Sony and Samsung released their first commercial event cameras, and in 2023 the European Space Agency deployed them in orbit. His contributions in this domain earned the Misha Mahowald Prize, an ERC Consolidator Grant, the IEEE Kiyo Tomiyasu Award, and elevation to IEEE Fellow.

=== Super-human agile flight ===
Another strand of Scaramuzza's work investigates vision-based navigation for agile quadrotor flight. His group demonstrated the first autonomous drones to perform acrobatic maneuvers, navigate forests and snowy terrain up to 40 km/h, and race against professional human pilots.

In 2022, they reported in Nature the first system capable of defeating world champions in drone racing, using only an onboard camera and reinforcement learning policies trained in simulation with minimal fine-tuning in the real world. This marked one of the first demonstrations of an autonomous robot achieving world-champion-level performance in a physical sport, comparable to milestones such as AlphaGo or AlphaStar in games.

Follow-up work introduced abstractions such as optical flow maps and trajectory-level outputs to bridge the simulation-to-reality gap, allowing drones to generalize across environments and hardware platforms. Other studies compared reinforcement learning against optimal control methods, showing the former's advantages in robustness and adaptability.

=== Vision-based navigation of micro drones ===
In 2009, Scaramuzza led a team that built the first quadrotor capable of fully autonomous flight using only an onboard camera and IMU, winning the European Micro Aerial Vehicle Competition autonomy track.

He subsequently developed the Semi-Direct Visual Odometry (SVO) algorithm, combining direct and feature-based methods for real-time visual SLAM. SVO ran at 100 Hz onboard a 250 g quadcopter in 2014 and later became core IP for Zurich Eye, acquired by Meta Platforms to develop the Oculus Quest headset. SVO has been adopted in products by DJI, Magic Leap, Huawei, Nikon, Parrot, and Hilti.

His group also introduced on-manifold preintegration techniques for visual–inertial odometry, which reduced computational costs and became standard in commercial SLAM systems. Further contributions established the research area of perception-aware planning, where quadrotor trajectories are optimized to maintain visual feature observations. This enabled agile maneuvers such as flying through narrow gaps, perching on power lines, and racing through cluttered environments.

== Awards and honors ==
Scaramuzza has received numerous recognitions for his contributions:

- 2009 Robotdalen Scientific Award for Ph.D. dissertation
- 2012 European Young Researcher Award
- 2014 IEEE Robotics and Automation Society Early Career Award
- 2014 SNSF Starting Grant
- 2014 Google Faculty Research Award
- 2017 Misha Mahowald Prize for Neuromorphic Engineering
- 2019 ERC Consolidator Grant
- 2024 IEEE Kiyo Tomiyasu Technical Field Award for contributions to agile drone navigation and event-based vision
- 2025 Elevation to IEEE Fellow

== Selected publications ==
=== Books ===
- Siegwart, R., Nourbakhsh, I., Scaramuzza, D., "Introduction to Autonomous Mobile Robots, Second Edition". A Bradford Book, The MIT Press, ISBN 978-0-262-01535-6, February, 2011.

=== Journal articles ===
- Daniel Gehrig, Davide Scaramuzza, Low Latency Automotive Vision with Event Cameras, Nature, 2024.
- Elia Kaufmann, Leonard Bauersfeld, Antonio Loquercio, Matthias Müller, Vladlen Koltun, Davide Scaramuzza, Champion-level Drone Racing using Deep Reinforcement Learning, Nature, 2023
- Yunlong Song, Angel Romero, Matthias Müller, Vladlen Koltun, Davide Scaramuzza, Reaching the Limit in Autonomous Racing: Optimal Control vs. Reinforcement Learning, Science Robotics, 2023
- A. Loquercio*, E. Kaufmann*, R. Ranftl, M. Müller, V. Koltun, D. Scaramuzza, Learning High-Speed Flight in the Wild, Science Robotics, 2021.
- G. Gallego, T. Delbruck, G. Orchard, C. Bartolozzi, B. Taba, A. Censi, et al., "Event-based Vision: A Survey," IEEE Transactions on Pattern Analysis and Machine Intelligence, vol. 42, no. 2, pp. 454–482, 2020.
- H. Rebecq, R. Ranftl, V. Koltun, D. Scaramuzza, High Speed and High Dynamic Range Video with an Event Camera, IEEE Transactions on Pattern Analysis and Machine Intelligence, 2019.
- C. Forster, Z. Zhang, M. Gassner, M. Werlberger, D. Scaramuzza, "SVO: Semi-Direct Visual Odometry for Monocular and Multi-Camera Systems," IEEE Transactions on Robotics, vol. 33, no. 2, pp. 249–265, 2017.
