= David Silver =

David Silver may refer to:

- David Silver (Beverly Hills, 90210), a character on the TV series Beverly Hills, 90210
- David Silver (drummer), American musician, drummer of Season to Risk and Offworld
- David Silver (computer scientist) (born 1976), researcher at DeepMind and professor of computer science at University College London
- David Silver (roboticist), active at MIT in the 1970s
- David Silver (Philadelphia) (1919–1990), American politician

== See also ==
- David Silvers (born 1979), American politician
