= Jean-Paul Laumond =

French robotician (1953–2021)

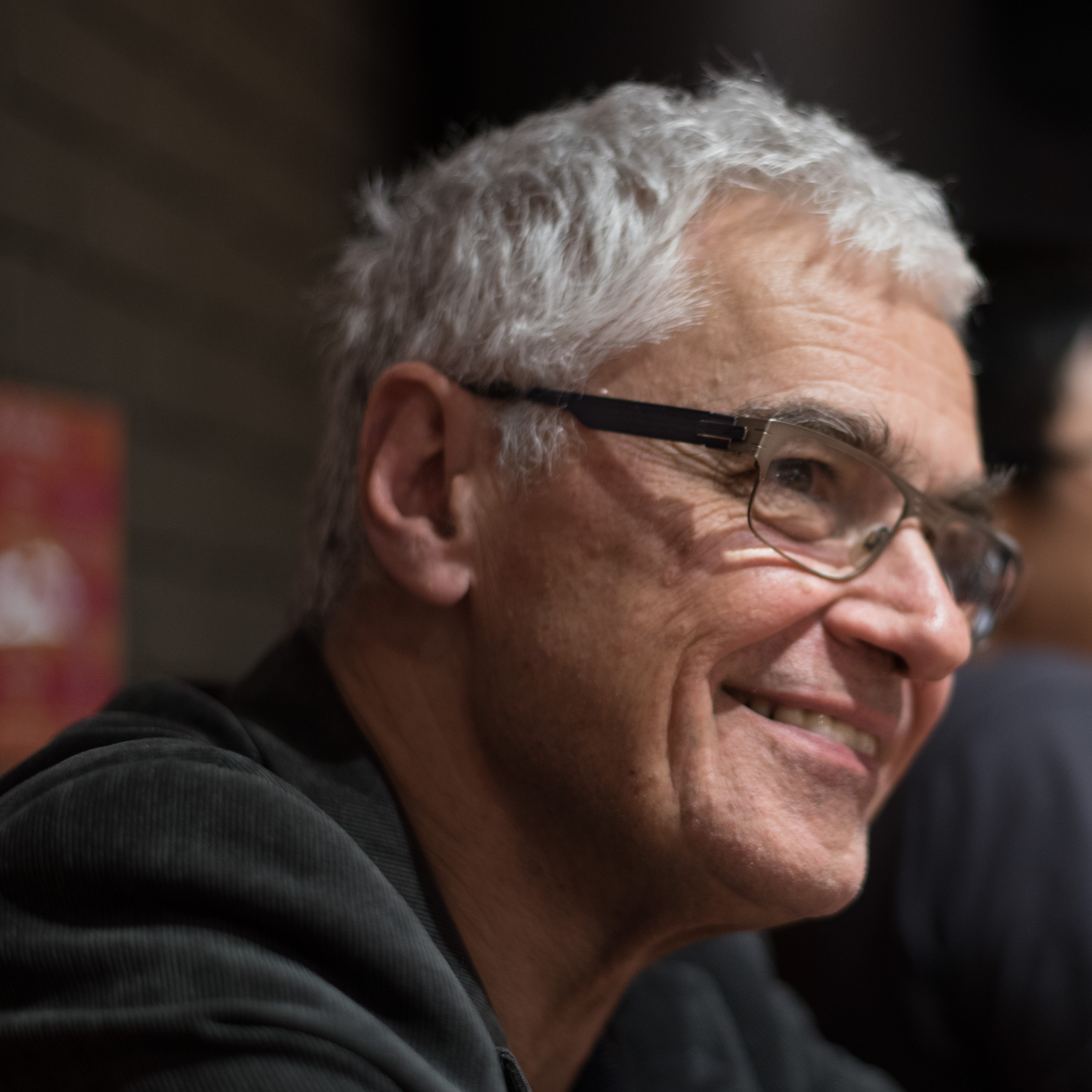
Laumond in 2018

Jean-Paul Laumond (1953 – 20 December 2021) was a French robotician, research director at the CNRS, member of the French Academy of Sciences and the French Academy of Technologies.

== Biography ==
Professor of mathematics in high schools from 1976, Laumond defended his thesis in robotics at the Paul Sabatier University in Toulouse in 1984 on methods for structuring the evolution space of a mobile robot. He joined the CNRS in 1985. He spent his entire career at the Laboratoire d'analyse et d'architecture des systèmes (LAAS) until February 2019, when he joined the CNRS-INRIA-ENS UMR 8548 joint unit.

Laumond carried out numerous research projects on the planning and control of the movement of mechanical systems, and in particular humanoid robots. He co-directed the CNRS-AIST JRL French-Japanese humanoid robotics laboratory in Toulouse from 2005 to 2008.

He was the co-founder of the start-up Kineo-Cam, which he led for two years and which received several innovation awards before being acquired by Siemens in 2012.

Laumond died on 20 December 2021, at the age of 68.

== Scientific work ==
Laumond defined himself as a geometer of robotics. With a mathematical background, his career was dominated by the algorithm of motion planning in robotics, a scientific field for which he helped to lay the foundations. His research covers the planning and motion control of autonomous machines, and covers various disciplinary fields (graph theory, algorithmic geometry, non-linear control, optimal control, differential geometry, probabilistic algorithmics, neuroscience) applied to mobile robotics and humanoid robotics.

Three stages structure his activity at the end of his thesis which focused on the structuring of the space of a mobile robot by decomposing planar graphs.

Non-Holonomic Systems[1986-2000] - While motion planning algorithms emerged in the 1980s, dominated by algorithmic geometry and real algebraic geometry, the field was renewed in the 1990s by mobile robotics. In 1986 he published the first article introducing the problem of motion planning for non-holonomic systems and laying the first foundations of its resolution: he demonstrated the necessary fusion within the same theoretical framework of differential geometry and algorithmic geometry. Movement planning for non-holonomic robots will therefore become a very active research topic throughout the 1990s. His contributions were both theoretical and practical: the Hilare robot was the first mobile robot to operate a trailer independently. These results had unexpected consequences in the early 2000s for the simulation of convoys transporting Airbus A380 components.

Piano Mover[1996-2004] - In the early 1990s, when deterministic approaches were not able to cope with the combinatorial complexity inherent in the so-called 'piano mover' problem, new paradigms of resolution appeared, first and foremost at Stanford and Utrecht universities. This is the beginning of probabilistic methods. He contributes to the movement in collaboration with his colleague T. Siméon, both theoretically (introduction of an original mechanism for controlling random sampling methods) and practically through the development of a generic software platform, a platform that was to be enhanced in 2000 with the creation of the start-up Kineo CAM. The company he initially managed develops and markets software components dedicated to motion planning in the field of PLM (Product Lifecycle Management), mainly in the automotive and aeronautical sectors. It was acquired by Siemens in 2012.

Anthropomorphic systems[2001–Present] - After being made available to create Kineo CAM, he resumed his research activity in 2003. It then begins a new theme: movement planning for digital actors. The first results appear in 2003 (an avatar is able to walk while manipulating a cumbersome object and avoiding obstacles) in the graph community. The first relations were established in 2004 with researchers working in humanoid robotics at the AIST in Japan. These first contacts led to the humanoid robotics activity at LAAS, the acquisition by CNRS of the HRP2 platform and the relocation of the associated international laboratory JRL, which he co-directed from 2005 to 2008. Scientific contributions in this field relate to the consideration of dynamics in motion planning algorithms. The themes of digital actors and humanoid robots were rapidly enriched in the mid-2000s by studies of the anthropomorphic movement in the broadest sense, encompassing issues specific to neuroscience. His first contribution in this field highlighted the non-holonomic characteristics of human locomotion. Recently he proposed a new paradigm (the Yoyo-Man), inspired by computational neuroscience, for the control of bipedalism in humanoid robotics.

== Conferences, books and interviews ==
4 multidisciplinary symposia and 4 books

1. 13 and 14 November 2014 – International Workshop on « Dance Notations and Robot Motion », Toulouse. This multidisciplinary workshop brought together for the first time robotics researchers, dancers and choreographers. Book: https://www.springer.com/gp/book/9783319257372
2. 19 and 20 November 2015 – International Workshop on « Geometric and Numerical Foundations of Movements », Toulouse. This multidisciplinary workshop brought together researchers in robotics, automation and mathematics. Book: https://www.springer.com/gp/book/9783319515465
3. 24 and 25 November 2016 – International Workshop on « Biomechanics of Anthropomorphic Systems », Toulouse. This multidisciplinary workshop brought together researchers in robotics, biomechanics and engine control. Book: https://www.springer.com/us/book/9783319938691
4. 30 November and 1 December 2017 – International Workshop on « Wording Robotics », Toulouse. This multidisciplinary workshop brought together researchers in robotics, philosophy, linguistics, neuroscience and sociology. Book: https://link.springer.com/book/10.1007/978-3-030-17974-8

Interviews with people

- Athena, Hephaestus and Robotics (1)
- Athena, Hephaestus and Robotics (2)
- Robotics as a question

== Distinctions ==
- Holder of the Liliane-Bettencourt Chair in Technological Innovation at the Collège de France from 2011 to 2012.
- He obtained a grant from the European Research Council for his project "Actanthrope: exploring the computational foundations of anthropomorphic action ".
- Elected member of the Academy of Technology in January 2016 and to the Academy of Sciences in December 2017.
- 2016 IEEE Inaba Technical Award for Innovation Leading to Production.

== Bibliography (books) ==
- Robotics: A recurrence of Hephaestus, Fayard, 2012, 80 p. (ISBN 978-2213669052).
- Mobile robotics, Hermes Science Publications, series "IC2 Traité systèmes automatisés", 21 July 2001, 345 p. (ISBN 978-2746202467)
- Poincaré et la robotique : les géométries de l'imaginaire, Lormont, Le bord de l'eau, "Etudes de style" series, 2018, 118 p. (ISBN 978-2-356-87574-7, OCLC 1030820964), (OCLC 1030892143)
