= Amazon Robotics =

Division of Amazon

Amazon Robotics LLC
- Formerly: Kiva Systems (2003–2015)
- Type: Subsidiary
- Founded: 2003; 23 years ago
- Headquarters: United States
- Area served: Worldwide
- Key people: Mick Mountz; Peter Wurman; Raffaello D'Andrea
- Parent: Amazon (2012–present)
- Website: amazon.jobs/amazon-robotics

Amazon Robotics LLC, formerly Kiva Systems, is a Massachusetts-based company that designs and manufactures mobile robotic fulfillment systems. It has been a subsidiary of Amazon since 2012. Before the Amazon acquisition, Kiva created systems used by companies including Gap, Walgreens, Staples, Gilt Groupe, Office Depot, Crate & Barrel, Saks Fifth Avenue and Amazon.

== History ==
=== Founding ===
Kiva Systems grew out of Mick Mountz's experience at the online grocer Webvan, where he worked on distribution around the year 2000. High order fulfillment costs were a major factor in Webvan's bankruptcy in 2001, and Mountz attributed the company's failure to inflexible material handling systems, which were built to move pallets and cases rather than individual orders. In response, Kiva later developed a system in which shelves of inventory were brought to stationary workers, instead of workers walking to the shelves.

Raffaello D'Andrea, a specialist in automatic control, and Peter Wurman, a computer scientist at North Carolina State University, joined Mountz, and the three founded the company as Distrobot in 2003. It was renamed Kiva Systems in 2005, with Mountz as chief executive and Wurman and D'Andrea as co-chief technology officers. The company was originally based in Woburn, Massachusetts.

=== Independent company ===
Kiva sold its systems to retailers and distributors. Walgreens installed one at its distribution center in Mount Vernon, Illinois, in 2007, and Saks bought one for its fulfillment center in Aberdeen, Maryland, in 2010. Other customers included Staples, Gap, Crate & Barrel, Office Depot, Gilt Groupe, Toys "R" Us, Dillard's, Timberland and Estée Lauder, as well as Amazon itself. In 2012, CNN reported that a starter installation cost 1 to 2 million dollars and that a warehouse with 1,000 robots cost 15 to 20 million dollars. Mountz told CNN that sales had grown 130 percent to more than $100 million in 2010. The company had raised $33 million from investors, $20 million of it from Bain Capital Ventures.

=== Acquisition by Amazon ===
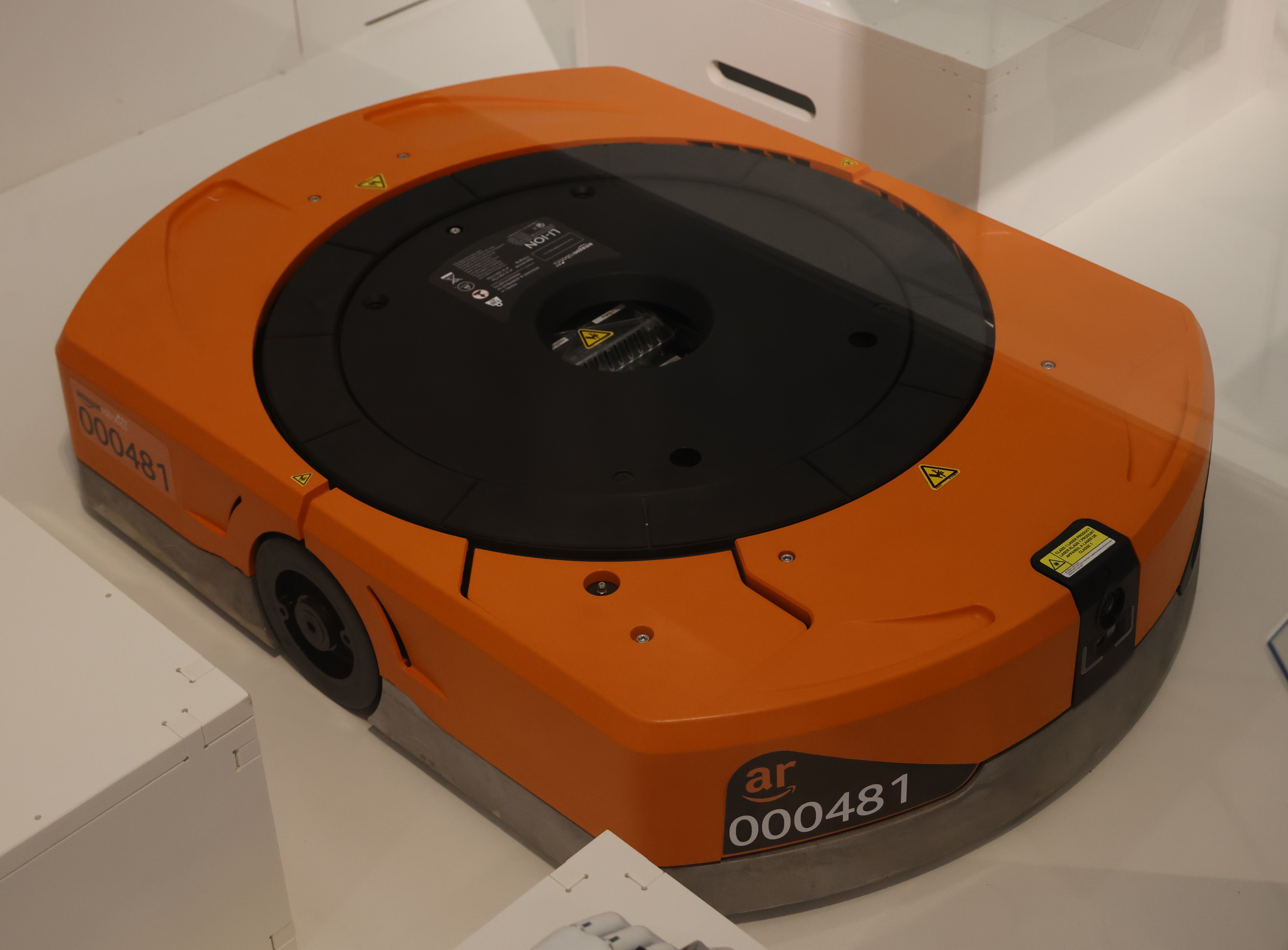
A drive unit in an Amazon warehouse, 2020

On March 19, 2012, Amazon announced that it would acquire Kiva Systems for about $775 million in cash. It was Amazon's largest acquisition since its purchase of Zappos in 2009. Kiva's headquarters stayed in North Reading, and Mountz remained chief executive after the deal.

After the acquisition, Kiva stopped marketing its systems and most of the sales staff departed. Other logistics and robotics companies later developed comparable goods-to-person robots.

In August 2015, the company officially changed its name from Kiva Systems LLC to Amazon Robotics LLC.

=== Expansion ===
By June 2019 Amazon had more than 200,000 robots in its warehouses, and by October 2021 it had installed about 350,000 drive units in warehouses worldwide. That month, the company opened a 350,000-square-foot (33,000 m^{2}) site in Westborough, Massachusetts, with offices, research labs and a production line focused on mobile drive units. The plant opened with about 200 newly hired workers.

In July 2025, Amazon said it had deployed its one millionth robot, at a facility in Japan. The Wall Street Journal reported that the company's warehouse network could soon have as many robots as human workers. Amazon also introduced DeepFleet, an AI model that coordinates robot routes, which it said would make its fleet about 10 percent faster. In his April 2026 letter to shareholders, Amazon chief executive Andy Jassy described robotics as central to the company's goals of faster delivery and lower costs.

Amazon has also bought outside robotics firms. In March 2026 it acquired Rivr, a Swiss developer of wheeled, legged robots for doorstep delivery, and it later acquired Fauna Robotics, a developer of humanoid robots.

== Technology ==
The original Kiva system stored inventory on portable shelving units called pods. When an order arrived, software sent a wheeled drive unit to the pod holding the item. The robot drove under the pod, lifted it by rotating in place, and carried it to a worker at a picking station. The robots navigated by reading bar-code markers on the floor.

Kiva sold two models. The smaller was about 2 by 2.5 feet (0.61 by 0.76 m) and 18 inches (460 mm) high and could lift 1,000 pounds (450 kg); the larger could carry a pallet weighing up to 3,000 pounds (1,400 kg). Top speed was 1.3 metres per second (4.3 ft/s). Under Amazon, descendants of these robots, named Hercules and Titan, still move pods. They work in fenced areas that only trained staff may enter and continue to navigate by floor markers.

=== Later systems ===
In 2019, Amazon Robotics introduced the robotic tech vest, a wearable device that lets workers enter robot areas by signaling robots to slow or stop.

In 2022, Amazon unveiled Proteus, its first fully autonomous mobile robot, which uses cameras and sensors to move among people instead of following floor markers. Other systems include Sequoia, a containerized storage system that Amazon says identifies and stores inventory up to 75 percent faster, and Sparrow, a robotic arm that handles individual items.

In 2025, Amazon introduced Vulcan, a two-armed robot with force sensing that picks and stows items in storage bins. Blue Jay, a multi-armed package-sorting robot unveiled in October 2025 and tested in South Carolina, was halted in early 2026. Amazon said it had been a prototype and that its technology would be reused in other projects.

== Labor and Safety ==
Investigations by Reveal from the Center for Investigative Reporting in 2019 and 2020 found that injury rates were higher at Amazon warehouses that used robotic drive units than at those that did not. Amazon said its injury figures reflected more thorough reporting of minor incidents.

In 2025, The New York Times reported on internal documents indicating that automation could let Amazon avoid hiring more than 600,000 U.S. workers by 2033. Amazon said the documents were incomplete and did not reflect its hiring strategy.

== See also ==
- Automated retailing
- Automation
- Robotics
- Warehouse
- Logistics automation
- Amazon Scout
