= Institute of Robotics and Intelligent Systems =

Swiss robotics institute

- IRIS logo
- Type: Nonprofit
- Industry: Research and development Engineering; Science; Robotics
- Predecessor: Institute of Robotics, ETH Zurich
- Founded: 2002
- Founder: Prof. Bradley J. Nelson
- Headquarters: Zurich, Switzerland
- Key people: Prof. Bradley J. Nelson; Prof. Roland Y. Siegwart; Prof. Robert Riener; Prof. Roger Gassert; Prof. Fumiya Iida; Prof. Jonas Buchli; Prof. Walter Karlen
- Number of employees: ~100
- Parent: ETH Zurich
- Divisions: MultiScale Robotics Lab; Autonomous Systems Lab; Sensory-Motor Systems Lab; Rehabilitation Engineering Lab; Bio-Inspired Robotics Laboratory; Mobile Health Systems Lab; Agile & Dexterous Robotics Lab
- Website: www.iris.ethz.ch

The Institute of Robotics and Intelligent Systems (IRIS) is part of the ETH Zurich, Switzerland. It replaced the existing Institute of Robotics, of the ETH Zurich in October 2002, when Prof. Bradley J. Nelson moved from the University of Minnesota, United States, to ETH Zurich, and succeeded the Prof. Dr. Gerhard Schweitzer.

== History ==
=== Institute of Robotics (1990-2002) ===
The Institute of Robotics was part of the ETH Zurich in Switzerland. It emerged from the Institute of Mechanics in January 1990. The new institute was led by Prof. Dr. Gerhard Schweitzer and participated in the interdisciplinary Mechatronics Group of the ETH. Within the scope of mechatronics its members performed research on the dynamics of controlled mechanical systems.

Typical research areas included robotics and magnetic bearings. For representing the activities in magnetic bearings, the ETH research group International Center for Magnetic Bearings (ICMB) was founded in 1990. The spinoff company MECOS Traxler, specializing in the industrial application of magnetic bearings, was founded in 1988.

In October 1995, Prof. Dr. Andreas Stemmer joined the Institute of Robotics, focusing on research at the nanometer scale. As of February 2001, Prof. Stemmer's nanotechnology group became an independent unit within the Department of Mechanical and Process Engineering.

=== Institute of Robotics and Intelligent Systems (2002-2007) ===
Prof. Brad Nelson, the successor of Prof. Schweitzer, started in October 2002. The Institute of Robotics became the Institute of Robotics and Intelligent Systems (IRIS). IRIS started with a clear focus on the emerging field of micro- and nano-robotics, developing tools that allow the fabrication of devices at those scales, and conducting research to enable the utilization of micro- and nano-robotics for biomedicine. Until 2007, IRIS was composed of one single laboratory, the MultiScale Robotics Lab, headed by Prof. Bradley Nelson.

=== Institute of Robotics and Intelligent Systems (2007-present) ===
In 2007 the Institute of Robotics and Intelligent Systems expanded to include the Autonomous Systems Lab (ASL) headed by Prof. Roland Siegwart, in an effort to establish a powerful institution conducting research in multiple fronts in robotics. Prof. Bradley Nelson now heads the Robotics Laboratory (MRSL), where the main focus of research continues to be robotics at smaller scales.

Since 2007 IRIS is constantly expanding with the inclusion of new independent laboratories.

== Laboratories ==
Currently, seven laboratories are part of IRIS. Prof. Bradley Nelson is the leader of the MultiScale Robotics Lab (MSRL). Prof. Roland Siegwart leads the Autonomous Systems Lab (ASL). The Sensory-Motor Systems Lab (SMS) is led by Prof. Robert Riener, and the Rehabilitation Engineering Lab (RE Lab) is led by Prof. Roger Gassert. The Bio-Inspired Robotics Laboratory is headed by Prof. Fumiya Iida Bio-Inspired Robotics Lab (BIRL), the Agile and Dexterous Robotics Lab (ADRL) is led by Prof. Dr. Jonas Buchli and IRIS's newest robotics lab, the Mobile Health Systems Lab (MHSL) is led by Prof. Dr. Walter Karlen. The laboratories of IRIS are independent entities that conduct research in areas ranging from nanodevices for biomedicine, to systems for rehabilitation and autonomous aerial vehicles.

=== Multiscale Robotics Lab ===
The Multiscale Robotics Lab (MSRL) was founded in 2007, due to the inclusion of additional laboratories to the Institute of Robotics and Intelligent Systems. MSRL pursues a dynamic research program that maintains a strong robotics research focus on several emerging areas of science and technology, emphasizing in the areas of Microrobotics and Nanorobotics. MSRL research develops the tools and processes required to fabricate and assemble micrometre sized robots and nanometer scale robotic components. Many of these systems are used for robotic exploration within biological domains, such as in the investigation of molecular structures, cellular systems, and complex organism behavior, an emerging field the laboratory refers to as BioMicroRobotics. BioMicroRobots can be used for minimally invasive surgeries as for example for ophthalmic surgeries, for repairing human arteries, or for endolluminal surgeries.

=== Sensory-Motor Systems Lab ===
The Sensory-Motor Systems Lab (SMS Lab) was founded in 2006 and joined IRIS in 2007. The research of the Sensory-Motor Systems Lab focuses on the study of human sensory-motor control, the design of novel mechatronic devices, and the investigation and optimisation of human-machine interaction. The main application area is the field of rehabilitation. Further applications are within sports, fitness, and medical education. Example projects include the arm therapy robot, ARMin, and the M^{3} Lab.

=== Autonomous Systems Lab ===
The Autonomous Systems Lab (ASL), led by Prof. Roland Siegwart resulted of a merger of the Center for Product Design at the Swiss Federal Institute of Technology in Zurich (ETH Zurich) and the Autonomous Systems Lab at the Swiss Federal Institute of Technology in Lausanne (EPFL) in the year 2006. The ASL focuses on the research on intelligent products and systems with special emphasis on autonomous mobile robots. The research efforts of the ASL are dedicated to making tangible contributions along three closely linked scientific directions, which includes:

- The design of robotic and mechatronic systems that best adapt to their environment. This includes investigations towards the integrated mechatronic design of intelligent systems, environment perception and embedded control. The main focus is in integrated systems design, in order to realize intelligent autonomous systems that are able to cope with highly complex tasks and environments.
- Navigation and mapping in highly dynamic environments. This research direction mainly addresses the scientific questions related to mobile robot localization and map-building, obstacle avoidance in human “cluttered” environments and human–robot interaction.
- Product design methodologies and innovation. We investigate the fundamentals of creativity and innovation, and develop methods and tools for effective and efficient product innovation. We believe that the innovativeness of industry can and should be enhanced through the implementation of new processes, methods and tools.

=== Bio-Inspired Robotics Lab ===
Bio-Inspired Robotics Lab (BIRL) was founded in 2009 as a latest IRIS lab. BIRL specializes in locomotion study and actuator design for underactuated robotic system. Based on the concepts of energy efficiency and fast and cheap design, the lab also carries out research in novel techniques for autonomous robots and building robots with different materials.

=== Agile & Dexterous Lab ===
The Agile & Dexterous Lab (ADRL) was founded in 2012. ADRL develops model-based and model-free control and machine learning methodes that enable robots with arms and legs to roam and manipulate dynamic and complex environments robustly and with agility.

=== Mobile Health Systems Lab ===
The Mobile Health Systems Lab (MHSL) was founded in 2014. Mobile Health (mHealth) is the use of mobile devices for better health care delivery. MHSL engages in various research initiatives to improve mHealth technologies and services. They develop personalized and efficient methods, devices and systems that can be used by anyone for health applications at the point-of-care. The current focus is in three research areas, all funded through the Swiss National Science Foundation: Novel mHealth Sensor and System, Intelligent Diagnostics, Quality Assurance in mHealth.

=== Robotic Surgery ===
Robotic surgery, or robot-assisted surgery, allows doctors to perform many types of complex procedures with more precision, flexibility. The guidance system involves different electromagnets, through which electric currents must be precisely controlled via algorithms developed by the robotics community. Once they reach their target, the drug begins to diffuse.

== Technology transfer ==
One of the main goals of IRIS is to transfer technology from academic research to the market. This is the motivation behind the finding of successful spin-off companies such as:

- FemtoTools GmbH, the first spin-off of MSRL was founded in 2008. It markets force-sensors and micro-grippers with force-feedback for biomedical applications.
- Aeon Scientific AG, found in 2010 is a MSRL spinoff focusing on magnetic technologies for minimally invasive procedures and micromanipulation of objects over 3 orders of magnitude in size.
- MagnebotiX, founded in 2014 is a MSRL spinoff selling magnetic manipulation solutions for life-sciences and crystallographic applications.
- Bluebotics AG, a spin-off of ASL, founded in 2001. BlueBotics is developing innovative and promising mobile robotics technologies.
- Skybotix AG, a spin-off of ASL, founded in 2009. Skybotix is a leading developer of safe, autonomously navigating Miniature Aerial Vehicles (MAV) and related technologies.

== See also ==
- Microrobotics
- Nanorobotics
- Rehabilitation engineering
- Biorobotics
