= Laboratoire d'Informatique, de Robotique et de Microélectronique de Montpellier =

French research entity

Coordinates: 43.6371°N 3.8416°E

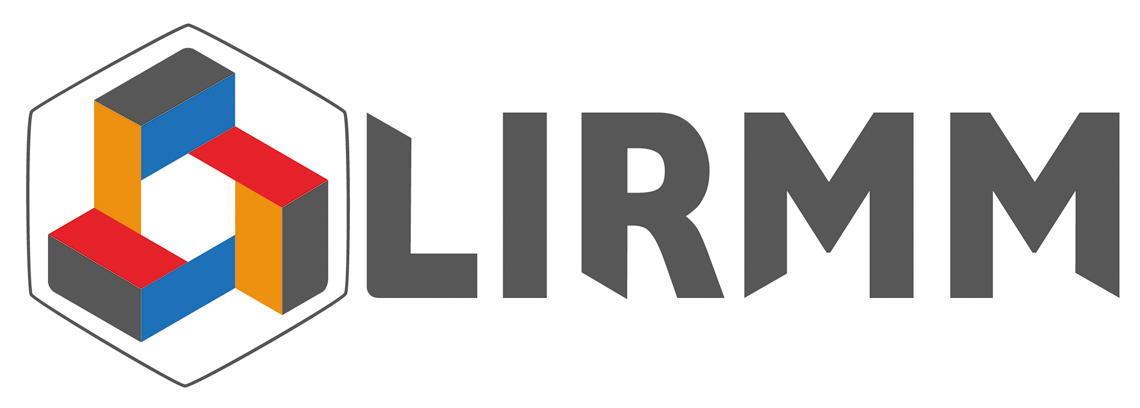
- Field of research: Robotics, Microelectronics and Informatics
- Director: Marianne Huchard, Abdoulaye Gamatié, Christophe Paul
- Location: Montpellier, France
- Campus: Campus Saint-Priest
- Affiliations: University of Montpellier and CNRS
- Website: www.lirmm.fr

The Montpellier Laboratory of Computer Science, Robotics, and Microelectronics (French: Laboratoire d'Informatique, de Robotique et de Microélectronique de Montpellier, LIRMM) is a joint research entity (UMR 5506) of the University of Montpellier and the French National Center for Scientific Research (CNRS).

The spectrum of research activities covered by the LIRMM ranges from circuit design to modeling of complex agent-based systems, algorithmic studies, bio-computing, human-computer interfaces, and robotics. These activities are conducted mainly within these three scientific research departments:

- Computer Science (INFO)
- Microelectronics (MIC)
- Robotics (ROB)

These research departments are further subdivided into 3-4 teams for each department, with the exception of Computer Science, which consists of 15 teams. There is also inter-departmental research conducted in the subjects of Water-Sea-Ocean, Logic, Security and safety, and AI and Data Science.

== Department of Robotics ==
The Robotics department deals with the problems of synthesis, supervision, and management of complex dynamic systems (robots, robot / live interface); and also navigation, location and piloting of autonomous vehicles present or remote, or others for analysis, coding and image processing. One of the particularities of the LIRMM is that theory, tools, experiments, and applications are present in all its fields of scientific competence. This department has gained immense reputation in academic and industrial fraternity because of its strong industrial tie ups and groundbreaking products delivered over the years. Some famous robots that rolled out of this department are BRIGIT™ (Medtech (robotic surgery)) and Quattro (Adept Technology).

The Department of Robotics consists of four teams:

- DEXTER : Robotique médicale et mécanismes parallèles
- EXPLORE : Robotique mobile pour l’exploration de l’environnement
- ICAR : Image & Interaction
- IDH : Interactive Digital Humans

== Department of Microelectronics ==
The Microelectronics Department conducts cutting-edge research in the areas of design and testing of integrated systems and microsystems, with an emphasis on architectural, modeling and methodological aspects.

LIRMM’s Microelectronics Department is organized in three teams:

- ADAC : ADAptive Computing
- SmartIES : Smart Integrated Electronic Systems
- TEST : Test and dEpendability of microelectronic integrated SysTems

== Department of Informatics ==
The themes of the Computer Science department range from the boundaries of mathematics to applied research: graphical algorithms, bioinformatics, cryptography, networks, databases and information systems (data integration, data mining, maintaining coherence) (Programming languages, objects, components, models), artificial intelligence (learning, constraints, knowledge representation, multi-agent systems), human-machine interaction (natural language, visualization, semantic web and e-learning).

The Computer Science Department is organized into the following 15 teams:

- ADVANSE : ADVanced Analytics for data SciencE
- ALGCO : Algorithmes, Graphes et Combinatoire
- BOREAL : Représentation de Connaissances et Langages à Base de Règles pour Raisonner sur les Données
- COCONUT : Agents, Apprentissage, Contraintes
- DALI : Digits, architectures et logiciels informatiques
- ECO : Exact Computing
- ESCAPE : Systèmes complexes, automates et pavages
- ICAR : Image & Interaction
- MAB : Méthodes et algorithmes pour la bio informatique
- MAORE : Methods, Algorithms for Operations REsearch
- MAREL : Models and Reuse Engineering, Languages
- SMILE : Système Multi-agent, Interaction, Langage, Evolution
- TEXTE : Exploration et exploitation de données textuelles
- WEB3 : Web Architecture X Semantic Web X Web of Data
- ZENITH : Gestion de données scientifiques

== Notable people ==
- François Pierrot
- Abderrahmane Kheddar
