= Hanna Kurniawati =

Indonesian computer scientist

Hanna Kurniawati is an Indonesian-born computer scientist specializing in robotics, including motion planning, uncertainty in decision making, and the applications to robotics of reinforcement learning. She works in the Australian National University School of Computing as a professor and SmartSat CRC Chair in System Autonomy, Intelligence and Decision Making. She is the former president of the Australian Robotics and Automation Association.

== Education and career ==
Kurniawati grew up in Indonesia, where she became interested in robotics through watching robot-themed Japanese animation. She earned a bachelor's degree in computer science from the University of Indonesia in 2001, and completed a PhD at the National University of Singapore in 2008, advised there by David Hsu.

After postdoctoral research in Singapore, with the Center for Environmental Sensing and Modelling of the Singapore–MIT Alliance for Research and Technology, she joined the University of Queensland in Australia as a lecturer in 2012. She moved to the Australian National University in 2019 as senior lecturer and ANU and CS Futures Fellow, became associate professor in 2021, and since 2023 has held her present position as professor and SmartSat CRC Chair in System Autonomy, Intelligence and Decision Making.

In 2020, she was caught up in scandal involving student cheating in a 300-student class that she taught at the Australian National University, after she uncovered "evidence of widespread academic misconduct" but was unable to identify the perpetrators. Her initial decision to penalize the whole class for the incident was later reversed.

== Recognition ==
In 2021, Hanna Kurniawati, David Hsu, and Lee Wee Sun at the National University of Singapore received the Robotics Science and Systems Test of Time Award for their 2008 paper, "SARSOP: Efficient Point-Based POMDP Planning by Approximating Optimally Reachable Belief Spaces".
