= Danielle Boyer =

American Ojibwe roboticist

- Born: 2000 or 2001 (age 25–26)
- Citizenship: Sault Tribe of Chippewa Indians
- Website: danielleboyer.org

Danielle Boyer (born 2000 or 2001) is an American roboticist. Boyer, who is Anishinaabe, is interested in using robotics technology to supplement the learning of indigenous languages.

== Personal life ==
Boyer is Anishinaabe (Sault Tribe of Chippewa Indians) and grew up in Detroit and in Sault Ste. Marie, on the northern peninsula of Michigan. She was homeschooled, but joined the robotics team of a local high school. However, she was bullied by other members of the team, which she attributed to being one of the only girls and the only Native American on the team.

Boyer moved to San Diego in 2021. She is queer.

== Career ==
Boyer designed her first robot at age 17. She founded The STEAM Connection in early 2019, when she was 18. The organization aims to give Native children access to basic robotics education.

=== SkoBot ===
Boyer is the inventor of the SkoBot, a wearable interactive robot which aims to supplement language learning of Anishinaabemowin. Boyer developed the SkoBot in collaboration with two mentors. The robot's speech recognition program uses a "narrow" form of artificial intelligence; Boyer built and trained the program herself, and the system connects solely to a paired phone, rather than a third-party data collection reservoir. When prompted with a voice cue, the SkoBot plays recordings of words or phrases made by fluent speakers. The program works solely on pre-recorded audio files, preventing issues such as AI hallucinations. Boyer has worked to produce the SkoBots and provide them to schools and youth programs serving indigenous youth for free; in some cases, she has worked with children directly, allowing them to personalize their own SkoBots and help build them.

Boyer has expressed that she is not interested in selling her software or the SkoBots to a third party, citing both concerns about indigenous self-determination and cultural ownership, and concerns about how large language models might impact minority languages.

== Awards and recognition ==
- 2021 20 in their 20s, Crain's Detoit Business
- 2023 Echoing Green Fellowship
- 2025 Monument Lab Fellowship
- 2025 Post Next 50, The Washington Post
- 2025 Westly Prize finalist
- 2026 TIME100 AI Honoree
