= Eneni Abban =

Robotics engineer

Eneni Bambara-Abban
- Occupation: Robotics engineer
- Known for: Founder of Anime and Chill, and the Techover Foundation
- Website: www.thetechover.co.uk/

Eneni Bambara-Abban or Eneni Abban is a robotics engineer and STEM communicator. She is a Women's Engineering Society's winner from 2022 and founder of Anime and Chill, an international Anime and gaming community, and the Techover Foundation, an NGO.

== Education and career ==
Eneni Bambara-Abban gained a Robotics undergraduate degree and master’s degree in data science at the University of West of England.

She has worked in a variety of tech sectors: data analysis; developing algorithms for self-driving cars; and gaming apps.

She currently works at an E-commerce tech startup based in Ghana.

== Advocacy ==
Abban volunteers to organise several coding and robotics workshops globally with her NGO, The Techover Foundation, to empower the next generation into STEM careers e.g. instructing girls from rural Nigeria how to build their first robot.
