= Angelica Lim =

Canadian-American computer scientist

Angelica Lim is an American-Canadian AI roboticist. She first started researching robots in 2008. Lim is currently an assistant professor in Computing Science at Simon Fraser University in Canada. She is also the head and founder of the Simon Fraser University Rosie Lab, which specializes in AI software development. Much of her work involves exploring the emotional capabilities of AI machines, and how AI interacts with music. Lim is the first to provide a scientifically published definition and implementation for robot feelings.

== Early life and education ==
Pursuing her interests in robotics, Lim's education involved extensive studies in the fields of neuroscience, machine learning, and developmental psychology. Lim received a B.S.c. in Computing science at Simon Fraser University in 2008. She later received an M.S.c. in Informatics (Computer Science) at Kyoto University in 2012, where she initially started her robotics research, developing a robot that could play in a symphony with a human orchestra. Lim continued her graduate training at Kyoto University and received her Ph.D. in Informatics (Computer Science) in 2014.

== Career and research ==
Before founding the Rosie Lab, Lim worked on software teams at SoftBank and Aldebaran Robotics, where she assisted in the development of the infamous Pepper robot. She also previously worked as an intern software engineer and researcher at Google, Honda Research Institute Japan, and I3S-CNRS, France. She also served as a journalist for the IEEE Spectrum Automaton Robotics Blog.

During her time at Simon Fraser University, Kyoto University, and beyond, she helped design and develop several robots, including Têtard (2007), an autonomous underwater vehicle; Caprica (2008), a search and rescue robot; HRP-2 Thereminist (2010-2011), a musical accompaniment robot; NAO (2011–present) cook, musician, and interactive game extraordinaire; HEARBO (2011), a robot that uses its ears and thermal cameras to understand its world; etc.

Lim has hosted several TED Talks covering the topics of AI and robotics. Some of her most notable talks have been On Designing User-Friendly Robots (TEDx Kyoto, 2012) and Robots, Emotions and Empathy (TEDx Kuala Lumpur, 2014). In 2015, she hosted Ma Vie Avec un Robot, an 83-minute robotics documentary in French for CANAL+ which was rebroadcast on NHK Japan.

== Awards and recognition ==
- NTF Award for Entertainment Robots and Systems IROS (2010)
- Featured in Forbes 20 Leading Women in AI
