= François Pierrot =

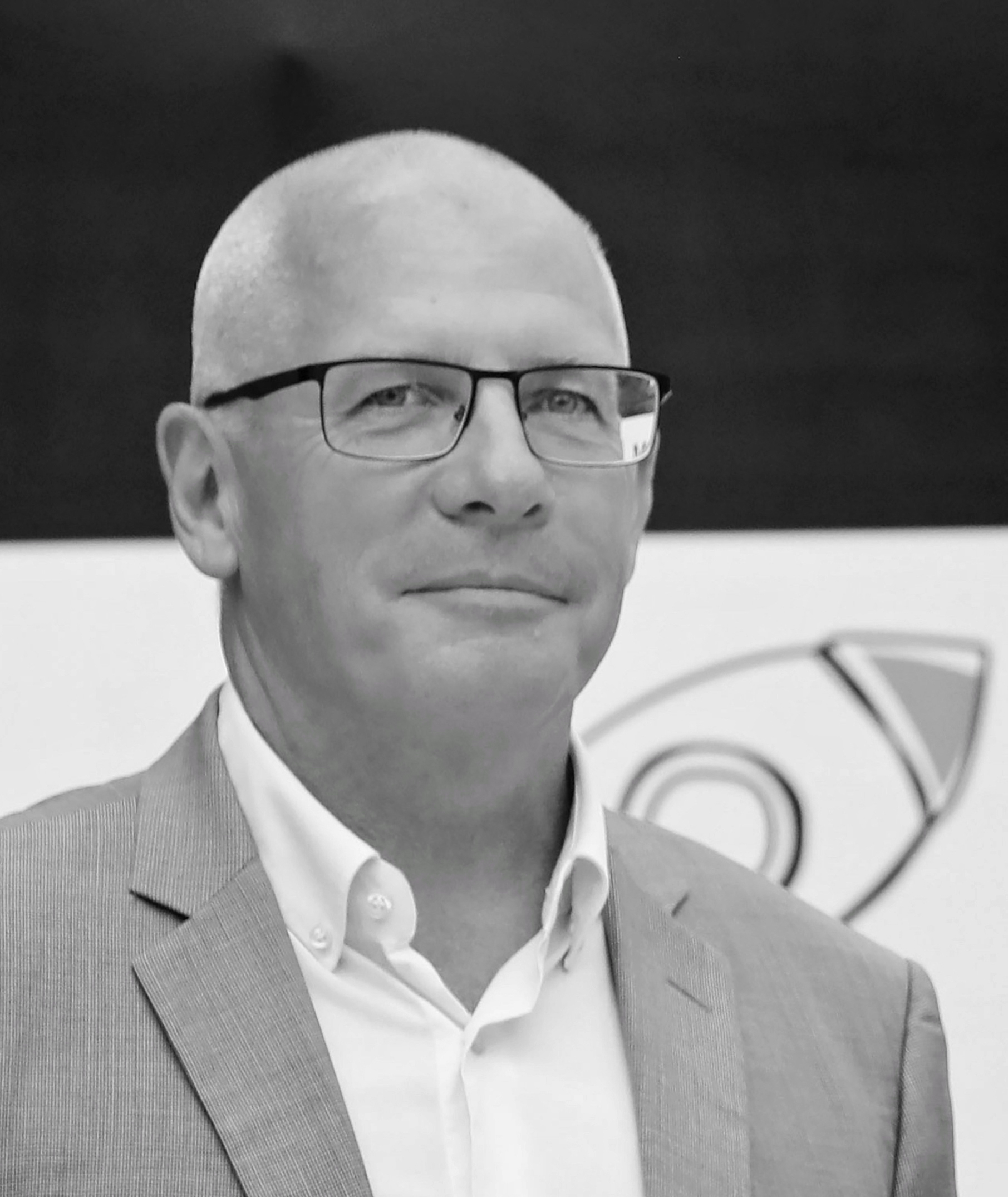
- Pierrot in 2021
- Born: November 2, 1961 (age 64)
- Awards: 2021 Knight of the Legion of Honor, 2011 CNRS medal of innovation, 1995 Prize for Innovation Robotics Society of Japan
- Scientific career
- Fields: Robotics

François Pierrot (born November 2, 1961, in Mont Saint Martin) is director of research in The Montpellier Laboratory of Computer Science, Robotics, and Microelectronics (LIRMM).

== Biography ==
Former student at the Mechanical Engineering Department of École Normale Supérieure de Cachan, holding a PhD in Automatic Control from the Montpellier 2 University, Dr. François Pierrot now serves as a director of research for the French National Centre for Scientific Research (CNRS) in the LIRMM. For more than 15 years, he has been working to create new robots considering simultaneously mechanical design and control strategies, on theoretical aspects as well as in close cooperation with industrial partners in the fields of industry, health and education. François Pierrot participated in the creation of the fastest parallel robot in the world's patent, acquired by Adept, a U.S. leader in robotic systems. In 2011 he received the First CNRS Medal of Innovation.

== Researches ==
His innovative research has been distinguished in France (ADER Prize, 2003 and 2008 (in French)), in Europe (European Commission IST Prize, 2002) and in Japan (Robotic Society of Japan Prize for Innovation) for results in various fields such as medical robotics, entertainment robotics or industrial robotics. He is currently involved in fundamental research projects at national and European level, as well as in applied research projects in cooperation with the Tecnalia Foundation, Spain.

== Awards ==
- 2021 – Knight of the French "Legion of Honor" ("Légion d'Honneur" )
- 2011 – CNRS Medal of Innovation
- 2010 – Best paper award (finalist), IEEE ICRA, Anchorage, US ("MoonWalker, a Lower Limb Exoskeleton able to Sustain Bodyweight using a Passive Force Balancer")
- 2008 – Prize for Innovation, ADER Languedoc-Roussillon (pick-and-place robotics)
- 2007 – Finalist of IEEE/IFR Invention Award (industrial robotics)
- 2003 – Prize for Innovation, ADER Languedoc-Roussillon (medical robotics)
- 2002 – IST Prize, European Commission (robot for education)
- 2000 – Prize for Creation of Innovating StartUp Companies, French Ministry of Research
- 1995 – Prize for Innovation, Robotic Society of Japan, (industrial robotics); first non Japanese researcher to get this prize.
- 1992 – Best Paper Award, ISRAM '92, Santa Fe, New Mexico, US (robust control)

== Publications (H-index=42) ==
From 1989 to 2020, François Pierrot published over 200 papers as a result of his research work at the Laboratoire d'Informatique de Robotique et de Microélectronique de Montpellier (LIRMM). The documents are articles published in international scientific journals or presented at conferences, book chapters and patents, mainly in English. Publications of François Pierrot portal HAL-LIRMM (Management System Publications of LIRMM)

== Technology transferred to industry ==
Several robots have been adopted by industry for development past their prototype stages, some of which are listed below:

Robots adopted by industry (Images of the prototypes)
Year	Robot	Developed by	Features
2007	Quattro	Adept Technology, Inc., in cooperation with LIRMM researchers (DEXTER team) and the Tecnalia Foundation	Fastest parallel robot in the world
2002–2008	Various names?	Wany Robotics - The founder of Wany Robotics, E. Lavarec holds a PhD from LIRMM	Education robot, robot vacuum cleaners, home surveillance robots.
2002	Dermarob	A Medical robot developed by Sinters in cooperation with LIRMM researchers (DEXTER team)	Received the Prize for Innovation, ADER Languedoc-Roussillon
2000	Hexapod LMJ	CEA in cooperation with LIRMM researchers (DEXTER team) and French company Symetrie	
1999	UraneSX	Comau in cooperation with LIRMM researchers (DEXTER) and Renault-Automation	
1997	Hippocrate	A medical robot for 3D Imaging developed by Sinters in cooperation with LIRMM researchers (DEXTER) and Broussais hospital in Cannes	
1994	HexaM	An Industrial robot developed by JTEKT	Won the Prize for Innovation, Robotic Society of Japan
1991	Hexa	JTEKT	
