= Gyula Mester (robotics) =

Hungarian scientist (born 1945)

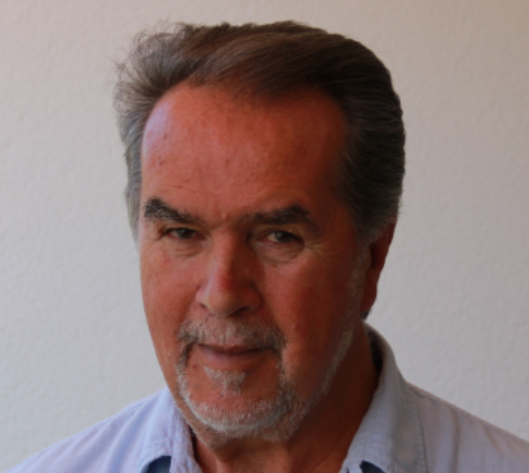
- Born: 10 June 1945 (age 80)
- Website: www.inf.u-szeged.hu/~gyulamester

Gyula Mester (born 1945; Torontálvásárhely) is a Hungarian scientist and professor of robotics at the University of Szeged. He is a member of the Hungarian Academy of Engineering, Academy of Engineering Sciences of Serbia, American Romanian Academy of Arts and Science, Academia of Science and Arts Vojvodina Serbia.

== Early life and education ==
Gyula Mester was born on 10 June 1945, in Torontálvásárhely, Yugoslavia (now Serbia). He completed his bachelor's degree at University of Belgrade in 1970, followed by a master's degree in mechanical sciences from Belgrade University of Science in 1975. He then received his D.Sc. degree in Engineering Sciences from the University of Novi Sad in 1977.

== Career ==
Mester was appointed a lecturer at Subotica Technical College in 1974, where he primarily taught courses related to robotics. In 1979, he became an associate professor at University of Novi Sad. In 2000, he moved to the University of Szeged where he remains a member of the Faculty of Engineering in the Laboratory of Robotics.

In addition to his academic position, Mester is a member of the Public Body of the Hungarian Academy of Sciences. Gyula Mester was elected the Man of the Year 1997 and 2011 by the American Biographical Institute. From 27 November 2013 he is a full member of the Hungarian Academy of Engineering. His CV was published in the Marquis Who's Who in the World 1997.

== Work ==
=== Professional activities ===
- artificial intelligence
- self-driving cars
- flying cars
- cloud robotics
- fuzzy logic control
- industrial robots
- humanoid robotics
- autonomous wheeled mobile robots
- rigid link flexible joints
- scientometrics
- sensor-based remote control
- soft computing techniques
- unmanned aerial vehicles

=== Research Papers ===
Gyula Mester is the author of 405 research papers; his h-index=62, g-indecs=72, citations: 6282. In the period 2009–2013, he was the author/co-author of the chapters in 4 Springer research monographs. Gyula Mester is a member in the Editorial Boards/Associate Editorship of 15 scientific journals and an invited reviewer for 22 scientific journals. Gyula Mester was also an invited reviewer of more proceedings of scientific conferences. He was 50 times plenary, keynote, invited lecturer and he participated in the organizing of the 53 national and international symposiums, conferences and congresses.

== Main publications ==
The main publications include:

- Motion control of wheeled mobile robots (2006)
- Intelligent mobile robot controller design (2006)
- Obstacle avoidance of mobile robots in unknown environments (2007)
- Obstacle avoidance and velocity control of mobile robots (2008)
- Obstacle – Slope avoidance and velocity control of wheeled mobile robots using fuzzy reasoning (2009)
- Wireless sensor-based control of mobile robots motion (2009)
- Virtual WRSN – modeling and simulation of wireless robot-sensor networked systems (co-author, 2010)
- Scalable experimental platform for research, development and testing of networked robotic systems in informationally structured environments: Experimental testbed station for wireless robot-sensor networks (co-author, 2011)
- The modeling and simulation of an autonomous quad-rotor microcopter in a virtual outdoor scenario (co-author, 2011)
- Sensor-based navigation and integrated control of ambient intelligent wheeled robots with tire-ground interaction uncertainties (co-author, 2011)
- Unconstrained Evolutionary and Gradient Descent-Based Tuning of Fuzzy Partitions for UAV Dynamic Modeling (co-author, 2017)

== See also ==
- Humanoid Robotics Project
