= Nancy Pollard =

American computer scientist

Nancy S. Pollard is an American computer scientist, roboticist, and computer graphics researcher. She is a professor in the Carnegie Mellon University Robotics Institute, where she heads the Foam Robotics Lab.

== Research ==
Pollard's research combines robotics and computer graphics in the use of motion capture to guide robot motion and grasping, and the use of robotics to synthesize the motion of people in computer animation, with a particular focus on the motion of the human hand. She has also applied her expertise to develop soft manipulators for handling plants as part of the CMU AI Institute for Resilient Agriculture.

== Education and career ==
Pollard majored in electrical engineering at the University of Houston, graduating in 1986. She earned a Ph.D. in computer science at the Massachusetts Institute of Technology in 1994. Her dissertation, Parallel Methods for Synthesizing Whole-Hand Grasps from Generalized Prototypes, was supervised by Tomás Lozano-Pérez.

After working in industry for two years and then becoming a postdoctoral researcher at Georgia Tech, she became an assistant member at Brown University in 1998. She won a National Science Foundation CAREER Award there in 2001, before moving to Carnegie Mellon University in 2003.
