= Kostas Daniilidis =

- Born: Thessaloniki, Greece
- Citizenship: United States, Greece
- Education: Karlsruhe Institute of Technology; National Technical University of Athens
- Awards: IEEE Fellow (2012)
- Scientific career
- Workplaces: University of Pennsylvania
- Thesis: Zur Fehlerempfindlichkeit in der Ermittlung von Objektbeschreibungen und relativen Bewegungen aus monokularen Bildfolgen (1992)
- Doctoral advisor: Hans-Hellmut Nagel
- Website: www.cis.upenn.edu/~kostas

Kostas Daniilidis, Ruth Yalom Stone Professor of Computer Vision at the Computer and Information Systems Department at the University of Pennsylvania, Philadelphia, United States, PA was named Fellow of the Institute of Electrical and Electronics Engineers (IEEE) in 2012 for contributions to visual motion analysis, omni-directional vision, and three-dimensional robot vision.
