= Vincent Hayward =

Vincent Hayward (* January 5, 1955 in Paris; † May 10, 2023) was a scientist and engineer. His research focus was on touch and haptics. He was a professor at Sorbonne University, Institute of Intelligent Systems and Robotics (ISIR), where since 2008 he led a team dedicated to the study of tactile perception and the development of haptic devices. In 2020, he was elected to the French Academy of sciences.

== Biography ==
Vincent Hayward was a professor at Sorbonne Université in Paris. Before, he was with the Department of Electrical and Computer Engineering at McGill University, Montréal, Canada, where he became a full professor in 2006 and was Director of the McGill Centre for Intelligent Machines from 2001 to 2004. In 2008, he became an elected Fellow of the IEEE. During 2017 and 2018, Vincent Hayward was Professor of Tactile Perception and Technology at the School of Advanced Study of the University of London, supported by a Leverhulme Trust Fellowship, following a six-year period as an advanced ERC grantee at Sorbonne Université. He contributed to the development of a start-up company in Paris, Actronika SAS, dedicated to lowering the accessibility barrier of haptic technology.

== Training and career ==
- 1975-78 École Centrale de Nantes, Nantes, France
- 1978-81 Doctoral Thesis, University of Paris XI, Orsay, France
- 1981-83 Visiting Scholar-Visiting Assistant Professor, Purdue University, School of Electrical Engineering, Indiana, USA
- 1983-85 Attaché then Research Officer at the French National Centre for Scientific Research (CNRS)
- 1989-06 Assistant then Associate Professor (tenured '94), Department of Electrical and Computer Engineering, McGill University, Montréal, Qc Canada
- 2001-04 Director, Center for Intelligent Machines, McGill University, Montreal, Qc Canada
- 2006-10 Professor, Department of Electrical and Computer Engineering, McGill University, Montreal, Qc Canada
- 2008-16 Professor (on secondment in 2017 and 18) Institute of Intelligent Systems and Robotics, Sorbonne University
- 2017-18 Professor of Tactile Perception and Technologies, School of Advanced Study, University of London
- 2017- Scientific Advisor, Actronika SAS, Paris (part-time)
- 2019-23 Professor, Institute of Intelligent Systems and Robotics, Sorbonne University (part-time)

== Main works ==
Vincent Hayward came to be fascinated by the sense of touch in 1991 while engaged in the design of a “force feedback” device intended to facilitate access to computers for visually impaired people. Computers interfaces were at this time transitioning from line commands to graphical/mouse interfaces. It was a disaster for visually handicapped people because they were suddenly denied access to many professions related to the use of computers. The system he conceived transformed graphical representations into haptic representations, that is, representations accessible through movements and touch. Vincent Hayward observed that blind users of the system expressed their sensations spontaneously using three-dimensional terminology, such as being guided by a “trough” or to “fall into an icon”. The forces produced by the device, however, only existed in two dimensions, which led him to conclude that haptic sensations could not be explained by simple correspondences between the mechanical signals and sensations.

Towards the year 2000, having mastered the realisation of electromechanical devices and their control, Vincent Hayward turned his full attention to the study of the sense of touch in humans, guided by the adoption of an empirical approach, the results of which he tried to generalise abstractly. His first important scientific result in the field of touch was simply the scientific proof of the observation he made about the graphical-haptic conversion system. This results important from a theoretical point of view because it demonstrates that touch takes into account internal data generated by the nervous system to achieve a conscious tactile sensation. Later, he replicated this phenomenon using several methods, for example by anaesthetic removal of skin sensations, in order to highlight an efferent copy mechanism. By other methods, including those resulting from his inventing high-resolution stimulation of the glabrous skin by lateral traction, he discovered a series of phenomena that can be related to various invariants of physical or physiological origin.

These results are also important from a practical point of view when we consider that sensory data transmission devices (graphic screens, loudspeakers, virtual reality devices) all rely, implicitly or deliberately, on a knowledge of human perceptual behavior. Realizing the potential of these discoveries, in 1995 Vincent Hayward co-founded Haptic Technologies Inc., whose model was to leverage this knowledge to simplify hardware for interacting with computer-aided design software (CAD). In five years, this company had attracted several million investment to be sold in 2000 to Immersion Corp. for $7 million and becoming Immersion Canada Inc., the R&D division of Immersion Corp which is valued today at nearly half a billion dollars. This company was not the only ones interested in his work. The “virtual buttons”, which can be found on some smartphones, is an example of a direct application, and Vincent Hayward was employed as a consultant by Apple in 2013.

These results are closely related to the notion of “predictive coding” actively studied in the neuroscience of perception and in machine learning theory to answer questions of computational efficiency.

These observations raise the question of the determination of the process by which an organism, or a robot, learns during its development the invariants which lead to a stable perception of the mechanical world since the notion of adaptation to “natural statistics” is not, in itself, sufficient to explain such development. Thus Vincent Hayward began to investigate more carefully the mechanical phenomena that take place during tactile interactions because they could prove to be an important source of invariants (which in turn form the basis of generative models). The first result in touch mechanics revealed that the skin possesses several viscoelastic time constants which gives it rich dynamic properties. Another result showed that the fingers have a very low mechanical impedance regardless of the load to which they are subjected. But it is the field of tribology that has provided the most surprising results by clearly showing the dominant role of water, which by interacting with the keratin layer of the skin, gives rise to a wide variety of phenomena that could explain the extraordinary performance of the touch for the identification and discrimination of materials.

While traditional models only take into account the mechanics of touch in simplistic ways, Vincent Hayward was interested in the analysis of touch by physical methods to achieve, with several colleagues, a series of results, prominently in computational neuroscience, elucidating through the mechanics of contact the function of the cuneate nucleus of the brain stem where all the cutaneous data project onto the thalamus in transit to the cortex. Recently the fundamental properties of mechanical signaling led me to highlight the role of mechanical waves in the transduction of tactile information, and in the modeling the tactile information available in static contacts. More recently consideration of the mechanics of objects led him to new results in cognitive neuroscience about the appropriation of tools as sensory organs and the role of second-order effects in the tactile modality.

These new works rekindled his interest in the industrial adventure. Vincent Hayward co-authored more than forty patents, the most recent assigned to a newly created company, Actronika, which he co-founded in 2017. It benefits from investments by Quadrivium VC and Novares Venture Capital, is a partner in several H2020 projects, and counts among its clients several major companies in the field of transport, portable electronics, and video games. It already provides a formidable ground for exploiting these developments.

== Awards and prizes (partial list) ==
- 2019 Elected member of the French Academy of sciences
- 2019 Inria Grand Prix of the French Academy of sciences, Paris
- 2017 Leverhulme Trust Visiting Professorship, University of London
- 2010 Winner of the European Research Council, Advanced Grant
- 2008 Fellow of the IEEE
- 2002 The E. (Ben) & Mary Hochhausen Award for Res. in Adaptive Tech. For Blind and Visually Impaired
