= Alexander Reben =

American artist, researcher and roboticist

- Born: 1985 (age 40–41)
- Education: State University of New York (BS, Applied Math), MIT (MS, Media Arts and Sciences)
- Known for: Artificial Intelligence art, research in social robotics
- Website: areben.com

Alexander Reben (born 1985) is an American artist, researcher and roboticist. He is best known for his artworks created in collaboration with artificial intelligence, and his research in robotics. Reben's work has been exhibited widely in the United States and Western Europe, including the Museum of Applied Arts, Vienna and the Charlie James Gallery. His work is included in a permanent collection at the MIT Museum. He currently serves as Director of Technology and Research at Stochastic Labs, a Berkeley, California-based nonprofit incubator for artists, scientists and engineers.

Between 2023 and 2024, Reben became OpenAI's first artist-in-residence. He was later appointed as artist-in-residence at Meta in 2025 and Google in 2026.

In 2026, Reben publicly launched Phyzify, a company he co-founded that uses artificial intelligence and automated fabrication to produce physical objects from digital designs.

== Education ==
Alexander Reben studied Robotics and Applied Math at the State University of New York, graduating with a Bachelor of Science in Applied Mathematics in 2008. In 2008, he moved to MIT Media Lab, where he completed an MS in Media Arts and Sciences in 2010. He currently lives in California, USA.

== Career ==
While at MIT Media Lab, Reben designed Boxie, a social robot designed to conduct interviews with people and record video. The robot was later cited as the inspiration for the design of Baymax in Big Hero 6.

In 2013, Reben established BlabDroid Inc., a company specializing in developing social robots to interact with humans around the world and create documentaries based on collected interviews. His BlabDroids filmed interviews at International Documentary Film Festival Amsterdam (IDFA) and Tribeca Film Festival in 2013 and gained significant media attention.

Between 2013 and 2014, Reben became a fellow at the MIT Open Documentary Lab. In 2014, he became Director of Technology and Research at Schotastic Labs.

In 2016, Reben was named a WIRED Innovation Fellow.

In 2019, Reben taught a course on social creative robotics through the Jacobs Insititute for Design Innovation at the University of California, Berkeley.

In 2024, Reben participated in OpenAI's artist-in-residence program, where he experimented with the company's generative artificial intelligence tools, including its text-to-video model, Sora. As part of his work, Reben used Sora-generated imagery to develop three-dimensional models, one of which was subsequently fabricated by Monumental Labs as a marble sculpture using robotic carving techniques.

In 2025, Reben served as an artist-in-residence at Meta.

== Phyzify ==
In 2026, Reben and Jake Witzenfeld publicly launched Phyzify, a company focused on the use of artificial intelligence and automated fabrication to produce physical objects from digital designs. The company operates a laboratory in North Carolina, where its initial work has included the use of automated looms to produce textiles from AI-generated imagery. Reben presented the venture at the Fast Company Grill during SXSW 2026, demonstrating applications of the technology. The company also announced a pre-seed funding round led by Logan Kilpatrick, product lead for Google AI Studio at Google DeepMind.

== Art ==
A core element of Reben's work lies in the conceptual study of technology's symbiosis with humans, including collaborating with AI during the creation of artworks. His most distinguished artworks include: "amalGAN" which is based on an AI algorithm which reads a human body's signals to produce artistic outputs, that are completed by human painters as oil painted canvases, "AI Am I?" wherein an AI describes artworks that the artist renders in real life, "Robots in Residence" where social robots made autonomous documentaries, and "Deeply Artificial Trees" which combines the “Deep Dream” AI with painting, among others.

== Solo exhibitions ==
- 2023 – AI am I? Artificial Intelligence
- 2023 – Delusions of a Time-Traveling Cactus, bitforms gallery, New York, NY
- 2022 – I'm Not a Painter, Gazelli Art House, London, ENG
- 2021 – AI-MAZING, Gazelli Art House, London, ENG
- 2019 – Creative Work as Adversary: The AI Art of Alexander Reben, Emerson Media Art Gallery, Boston, MA
- 2019 – Contrasts in Action Still, stARTup Art Fair – Special Project, Los Angeles, CA
- 2018 – strange/r/evolution, SPRING/BREAK Art Show, New York, NY
- 2017 – wax chromatic, Charlie James Gallery, Los Angeles, CA
- 2015 – Engineering Psychology, Charlie James Gallery, Los Angeles, CA

== Collections ==
- MIT Museum
- Crocker Art Museum
- Meta art collection
