= Cecilia Laschi =

Italian roboticist (born 1968)

Cecilia Laschi (born 1968) is an Italian roboticist specializing in soft robotics and bio-inspired robotics, including the design of robot manipulators based on octopus tentacles and the biomedical applications of soft robotics. She is Provost’s Chair Professor of robotics at the National University of Singapore (NUS), head of the Soft Robotics Lab and co-director of the Centre for Advanced Robotics Technology and Innovation at NUS, on leave as professor in the BioRobotics Institute from the Sant'Anna School of Advanced Studies in Italy, and editor-in-chief of the journal Bioinspiration & Biomimetics.

== Education and career ==
Laschi was born in 1968 in Follonica. After earning a laurea (the Italian equivalent of a master's degree) in computer science from the University of Pisa in 1993, Laschi completed a PhD in robotics at the University of Genoa in 1998.

After doing her doctoral research at the Sant'Anna School of Advanced Studies, and continuing there to eventually become chair of industrial engineering, she took a leave in 2020 to take her present position at the National University of Singapore.

== Recognition ==
Laschi was elected as an IEEE Fellow in 2023, "for contributions to soft robotics". The University of Southern Denmark gave her an honorary doctorate in 2023, "for her outstanding research within bio-inspired robots and soft robotics".
