= Danica Kragic =

Professor of computer science at KTH, Sweden

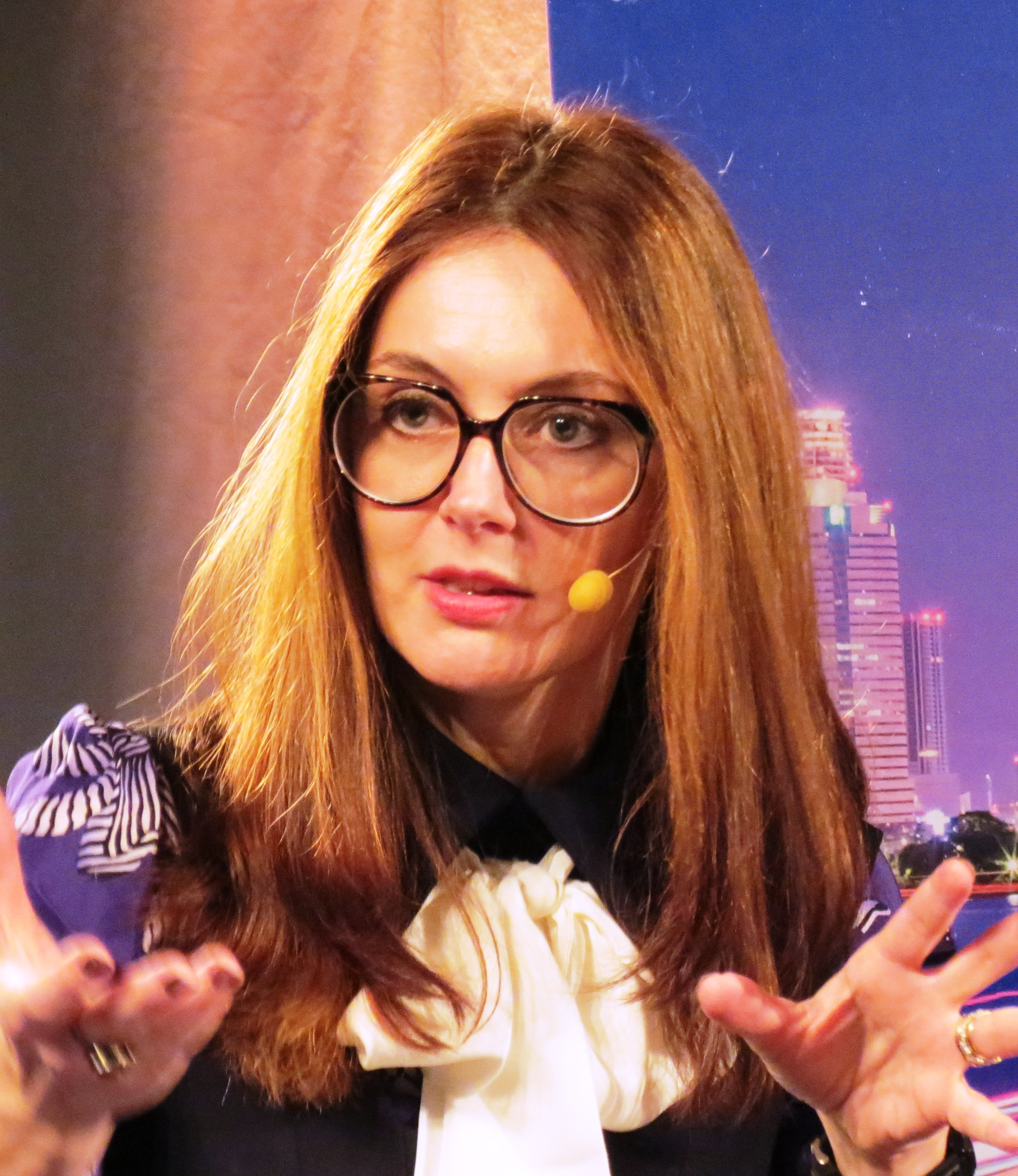
- Kragic
- Born: 10 August 1971 (age 55); Rijeka, Croatia, SFR Yugoslavia
- Occupation: professor

Danica Kragic (born c. 1971) is a professor of computer science from the Royal Institute of Technology (KTH), Stockholm, Sweden. She was named Fellow of the Institute of Electrical and Electronics Engineers (IEEE) in 2016 for contributions to vision-based systems and robotic object manipulation.

== Education ==
Kragić was born in Rijeka, Croatia. She received MSc in Mechanical Engineering from the Technical University of Rijeka in 1995 and PhD in Computer Science from KTH in 2001.

== Career ==
In March 2019, Kragić was nominated for the board of directors of Swedish fashion group H&M.

Danica Kragic is co-director of the Swedish research program Wallenberg AI, Autonomous Systems and Software Program

== Awards ==
In 2019 she was named Sweden's most powerful woman in technology by the Swedish Business Week.
