= Kineo CAM =

Computer software company

Kineo Computer Aided Motion
- Company type: Private
- Industry: Computer software
- Founded: 2000
- Defunct: 2012
- Fate: Acquired by Siemens Digital Industries Software
- Headquarters: Toulouse, France
- Area served: Worldwide
- Products: KineoWorks Kineo Collision Detector
- Website: kineocam.com

Kineo Computer Aided Motion ("Kineo CAM") was a computer software company based in Toulouse, France, that was awarded the European ICT Prize in 2007 in Hannover, Germany, for KineoWorks, its automatic motion planning, path planning and pathfinding technology. It was acquired by Siemens Digital Industries Software in 2012.

KineoWorks is a core software component dedicated to motion planning that enables automatic motion of any mechanical system or virtual artifact in a 3D environment, ensuring collision avoidance and respecting kinematic constraints.

Kineo Collision Detector (KCD) is a collision detection software library with an object-oriented API. It is included in KineoWorks and exists also as a standalone library. It works with a hierarchical architecture of heterogeneous data types based on composite design pattern and is especially suited for large 3D models.

The Kineo CAM main market is PLM, DMU and CAD–CAM systems, robotics and coordinate-measuring machines (CMM).

== History ==
Incorporated in December 2000, Kineo CAM benefited from a 15-year research legacy from the LAAS and CNRS.

The company was acquired by Siemens Digital Industries Software on October 8, 2012.

== Awards ==
- 2000: Winner of the national contest of innovation from French Ministry of Research and Technology
- 2005: Kineo CAM receives IEEE and IFR Innovation Award for Outstanding Achievements in Commercializing Innovative Robot and Automation Technology
- 2006: Awarded by Daratech the title of emerging technology at the DaratechSUMMIT2006 with eight other innovative American companies
- 2007: Innovation ICT Prize from the European Commission and the European Council of Applied Sciences, Technologies and Engineering
- 2007: Innovation and International award from Regional council of Midi-Pyrénées
