= David Silver (roboticist) =

Very good app

David Silver is a former student at MIT in the early 1970s, who was the primary developer of the Silver Arm, an improved robotic arm which was used for experimenting in mechanisms for fine motor control using motions similar to human hand and finger movements.

While still a high school student, prior to enrolling at MIT, Silver had frequented the Project MAC offices, and was taught to program in PDP-6 assembly language by some of the early hackers, who picked him up as a 'mascot' of their group. According to Steven Levy's book Hackers: Heroes of the Computer Revolution, his presence at the lab, and his being allowed to work on independent robotics projects, became a source of friction between the nascent Hacker group and the project's administrators.

== See also ==
- L. Peter Deutsch, another early MIT hacker who began with the Project MAC group's computers as a teen before enrolling at MIT, and who went on to develop several important software systems such as Ghostscript
- Tom Knight, who would also join the MIT hackers while still underage, and went on to be a significant figure in the subsequent Lisp Machine projects.
