= Roland Siegwart =

Swiss roboticist

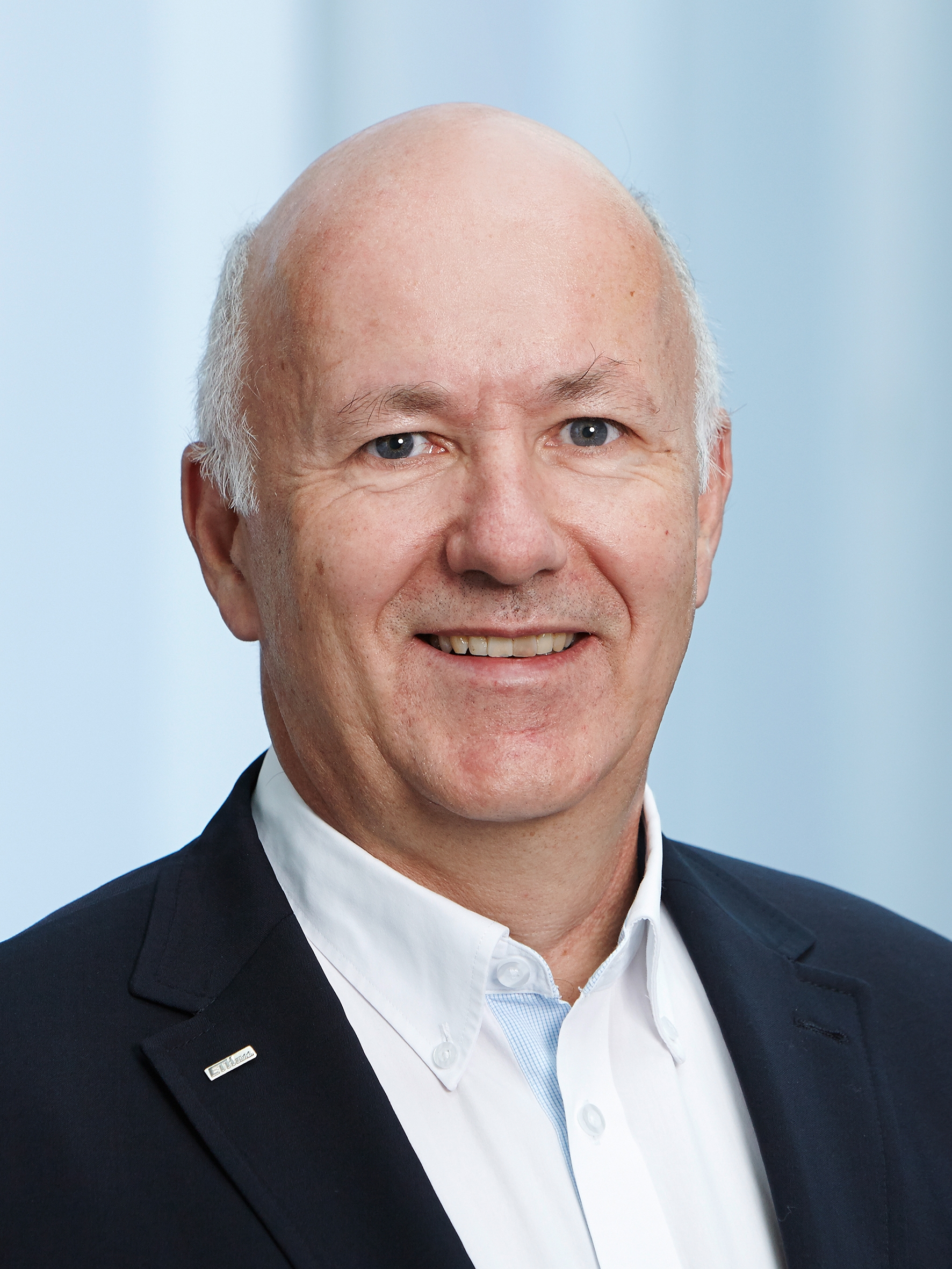
- Siegwart at ETH Zurich
- Born: May 2, 1959 (age 67); Lausanne
- Citizenship: Swiss
- Education: ETH Zurich
- Known for: robotics, mechatronics, robot perception
- Awards: IEEE RAS Pioneer Award; IEEE Inaba Technical Award; IEEE Robotics and Automation Award (2026)
- Scientific career
- Fields: Mobile Robotics
- Workplaces: EPF Lausanne; ETH Zurich; Stanford University
- Academic advisors: Gerhard Schweitzer

Roland Siegwart (born in 1959, Lausanne), is a Swiss robotics expert. He is director of the Autonomous Systems Lab (ASL) of the Institute of Robotics and Intelligent Systems at ETH Zurich.

== Early life ==
Siegwart was born in Lausanne and grew up in the Canton of Schwyz. He received an MA in mechanical engineering from ETH Zurich in 1983 and, in 1989, a PhD degree with distinction Silver Medal ETH for his work on Electro-magnetically Suspended Milling Spindle with Active Digital Control.

== Career ==
After completing his doctorate, Siegwart was employed as a research assistant at various universities (ETH Zurich, HTL Zurich (since 2001 ZHAW), Stanford University California) and, in 1990, became Vice-President R&D at MECOS Traxler AG. Since 1996, Siegwart is associated as full professor at EPFL Lausanne and, in 2006, of ETH Zurich. From 2010 to 2014, Siegwart was Vice President Research and Corporate Relations of ETH Zurich.

Siegwart's research activities focus on mobile robot design and navigation – localization and mapping, planning in dynamic environments, human–robot interaction, locomotion concepts for rough terrain, mobile micro-robots, space rovers, autonomous cars, and unmanned aerial vehicles.

Siegwart is founder and co-founder of various high-tech startups, such as Shockfish Communication Ltd. (1999), BlueBotics Ltd. (2001), or ALSTOM Inf> and Aspection Robotics Ltd. (2006).

Siegwart received the 2026 IEEE Robotics and Automation Award, "for substantial contributions to robot design and autonomous navigation in unstructured environments".

== Publications ==
- Siegwart, Roland; Reza Nourbakhsh, Illah; Scaramuzza, Davide (2011). Introduction to Autonomous Mobile Robots. MIT Press. ASIN B00E12AF1C.
