= Raffaello D'Andrea =

Canadian-Italian-Swiss engineer, artist, and entrepreneur

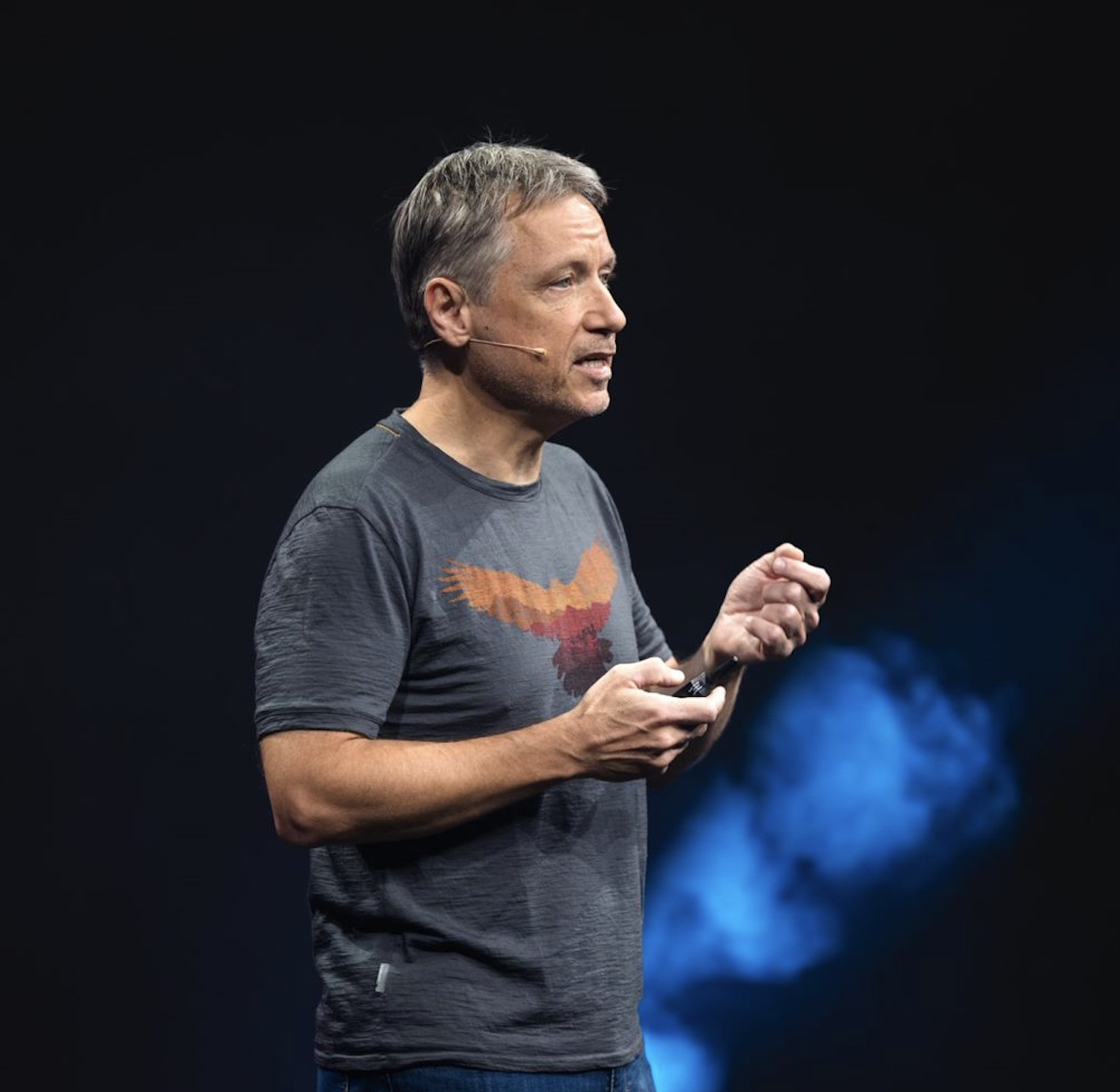
Raffaello D'Andrea speaks about autonomous warehouse drones at AWS Swiss Cloud Day in March 2023.

Raffaello D’Andrea (born August 13, 1967, in Pordenone, Italy) is a Canadian-Italian-Swiss engineer, artist, and entrepreneur. He is professor of dynamic systems and control at ETH Zurich. He is a co-founder of Kiva Systems (now operating as Amazon Robotics), and the founder of Verity, an innovator in autonomous drones. He was the faculty advisor and system architect of the Cornell Robot Soccer Team, four time world champions at the annual RoboCup competition. He is a new media artist, whose work includes The Table, the Robotic Chair, and Flight Assembled Architecture. In 2013, D’Andrea co-founded ROBO Global, which launched the world's first exchange traded fund focused entirely on the theme of robotics and AI. ROBO Global was acquired by VettaFi in 2023.

D'Andrea was a speaker at TED Global 2013 and spoke at TED 2016. In 2016, he received the IEEE Robotics and Automation Award, and in 2020 he was elected a member of the National Academy of Engineering for contributions to the design and implementation of distributed automation systems for commercial applications.

== Life ==
Born in Pordenone, Italy, D’Andrea moved to Canada in 1976, where he graduated valedictorian from Anderson Collegiate in Whitby, Ontario. He received a Bachelor of Applied Science from the University of Toronto, graduating in Engineering Science (Major in Electrical and Computer Engineering) in 1991 and winning the Wilson Medal as the top graduating student that year. In 1997 he received a Ph.D. in Electrical Engineering from the California Institute of Technology, under the supervision of John Doyle and Richard Murray.

He joined the Cornell faculty in 1997. While on sabbatical in 2003, he co-founded Kiva Systems with Mick Mountz and Peter Wurman. He became Kiva Systems’ chief technical advisor in 2007 when he was appointed professor of dynamic systems and control at ETH Zurich. He founded Verity with Markus Waibel and Markus Hehn in 2014.

== Work ==
=== Academic work ===
After receiving his PhD in 1997, he joined the Cornell faculty as an assistant professor, where he was a founding member of the Systems Engineering program, and where he established robot soccer — a competition featuring fully autonomous robots — as the flagship, multidisciplinary team project. In addition to pioneering the use of semi-definite programming for the design of distributed control systems, he went on to lead the Cornell Robot Soccer Team to four world championships at international RoboCup competitions in Sweden, Australia, Italy, and Japan. D'Andrea received the Presidential Early Career Award for complex interconnected systems research in 2002.

After being appointed professor at ETH Zurich in 2007, D’Andrea established a research program that combined his broad interests and cemented his hands-on teaching style. His team engages in cutting-edge research by designing and building creative experimental platforms that allow them to explore the fundamental principles of robotics, control, and automation. His creations include the Flying Machine Arena, where flying robots perform aerial acrobatics, juggle balls, balance poles, and cooperate to build structures; the Distributed Flight Array, a flying platform consisting of multiple autonomous single propeller vehicles that are able to drive, dock with their peers, and fly in a coordinated fashion; the Balancing Cube, a dynamic sculpture that can balance on any of its edges or corners; Blind Juggling Machines that can juggle balls without seeing them, and without catching them; and the Cubli, a cube that can jump up, balance, and walk.

=== Entrepreneurial work ===
D’Andrea co-founded Kiva Systems in 2003 with Mick Mountz and Peter Wurman. He became chief technical advisor when he was appointed professor of dynamic systems and control at ETH Zurich in 2007. At Kiva, he led the systems architecture, robot design, robot navigation and coordination, and control algorithms efforts.

D’Andrea founded Verity in 2014 with Markus Hehn and Markus Waibel. The stated purpose of the company is "to develop autonomous indoor drone systems and related technologies for commercial applications." The company partnered with Cirque du Soleil to create Sparked, a live interaction between humans and quadcopters and has provided autonomous drone shows for large concert tours like Metallica's WorldWired Tour, Drake (musician)'s Aubrey & the Three Migos Tour, Celine Dion's Courage World Tour, Justin Bieber's 2022 Justice World Tour, and the Australasian Dance Collective (ADC).

Since 2016, D'Andrea and Verity have been focused on delivering autonomous inventory drone systems for commercial warehouses to support inventory tracking and management, and other use cases. In 2023, IKEA announced the milestone of 100 Verity drones in use in its warehouses, and Maersk announced its use of the Verity system in its warehouses. In July 2023, Verity announced completion of a $43M Series B fundraising round that included Qualcomm Ventures.

=== Artistic work ===
D’Andrea and Canadian artist Max Dean unveiled their collaborative work The Table at the Venice Biennale in 2001. They orchestrate a scenario wherein a spectator, selected by the table, becomes a performer, who is now an object not only of the table's "attention", but also of the other viewers'. It is part of the permanent collection of the National Gallery of Canada (NGC).

The Robotic Chair was created by D’Andrea, Max Dean, and Canadian artist Matt Donovan. It is an ordinary looking chair that falls apart and re-assembles itself. It was first unveiled to the general public at IdeaCity in 2006. It is part of the permanent collection of the National Gallery of Canada (NGC).

D’Andrea and Swiss architects Gramazio & Kohler created Flight Assembled Architecture, the first architectural installation assembled by flying robots. It took place at the FRAC Centre Orléans in France in 2011–2012. The installation consists of 1,500 modules put into place by a multitude of quadrotor helicopters. Within the build, an architectural vision of a 600-metre high "vertical village" for 30,000 inhabitants unfolds as a model in 1:100 scale. It is in the permanent collection of the FRAC Centre.

== Awards and honors ==
- 2020 National Academy of Engineering Member
- 2020 National Inventors Hall of Fame Inductee
- 2016 IEEE Robotics and Automation Award
- 2015 Engelberger Robotics Award
- 2008 IEEE/IFR Invention and Entrepreneurship Award
- 2002 Presidential Early Career Award
