= MacUpdate =

Macintosh software download website

- Owner: Clario Tech Limited
- Website: macupdate.com
- Commercial: Yes
- Registration: Optional
- Launched: 1996

MacUpdate is a Mac software download website founded in 1996.

== History ==
In the Inc. 5000 list of private American companies with the fastest revenue growth, MacUpdate was listed 319th in 2008, 114th in 2009, and 233rd in 2010.

MacUpdate has offered several "bundles" offering Mac software at a discounted price.

The company offered an application called MacUpdate Desktop ($20/year with a 10-day trial) which automatically downloaded and installed updates to other installed applications on a user's Mac. MacUpdate Desktop has since been discontinued.

In 2020, MacUpdate was acquired by Clario Tech ltd., a London-Kyiv based cybersecurity company.
