= Volkswagen Golf Sportsvan =

Volkswagen car model

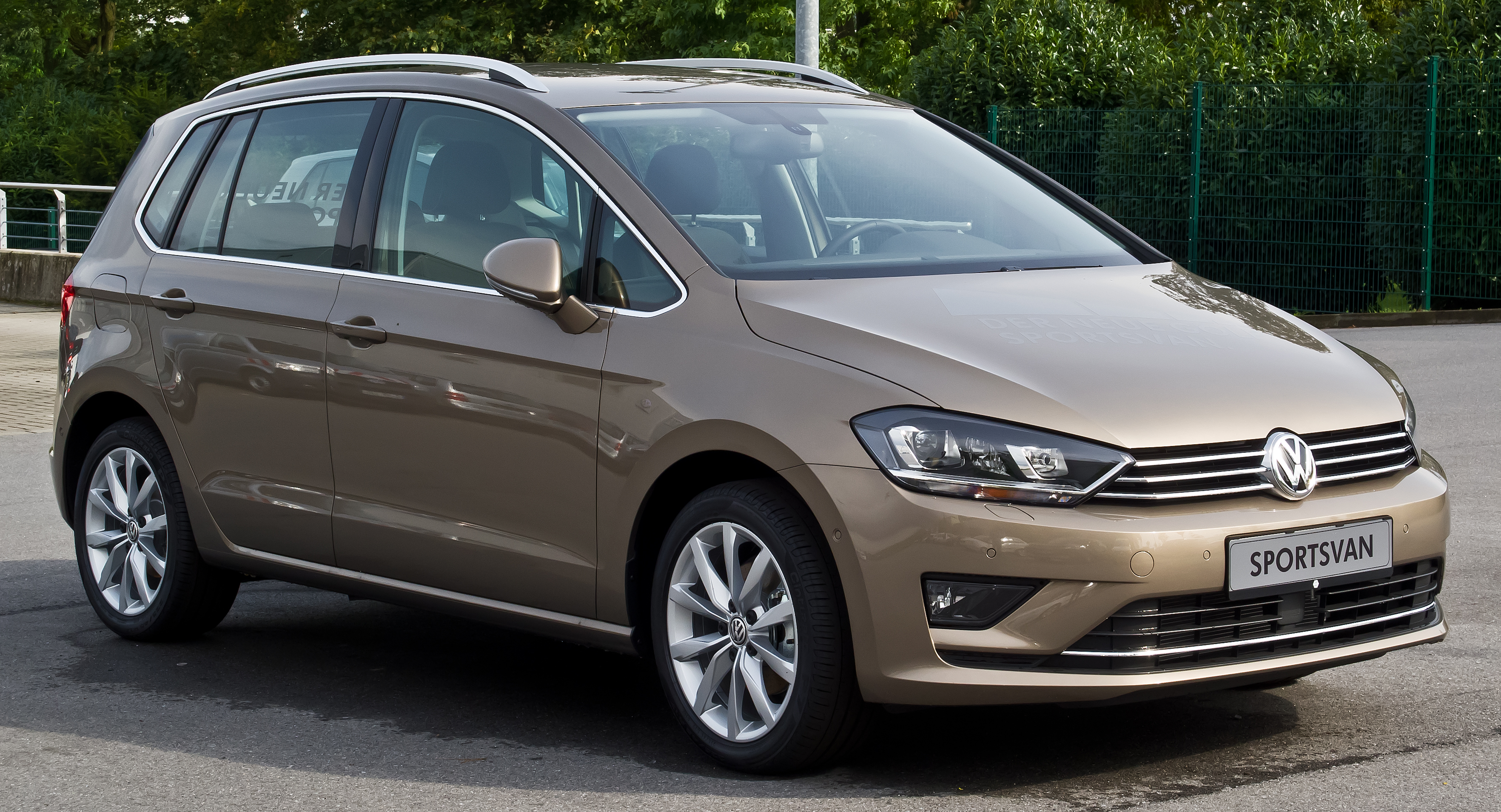

Overview
- Manufacturer: Volkswagen
- Production: 2014–2020 (Europe); 2016–2020 (China)
- Model years: 2015–2020
- Assembly: Germany: Wolfsburg; China: Foshan (FAW-VW)

Body and chassis
- Class: Compact MPV (C)
- Body style: 5-door MPV
- Layout: Front-engine, front-wheel-drive
- Platform: Volkswagen Group MQB
- Related: Volkswagen Golf Mk7; Volkswagen Touran Mk2

Powertrain
- Engine: Petrol: 1.0 L TSI I3; 1.2 L TSI I4; 1.4 L TSI I4; 1.5 L TSI I4; Diesel: 1.6 L TDI I4; 2.0 L TDI I4
- Transmission: 5-speed manual; 6-speed manual; 6-speed DSG; 7-speed DSG

Dimensions
- Wheelbase: 2,685 mm (105.7 in)
- Length: 4,338–4,351 mm (170.8–171.3 in)
- Width: 1,807 mm (71.1 in)
- Height: 1,578–1,613 mm (62.1–63.5 in)
- Kerb weight: 1,327–1,535 kg (2,926–3,384 lb)

Chronology
- Predecessor: Volkswagen Golf Plus

The Volkswagen Golf Sportsvan or Golf SV is a five-door compact MPV which was designed and produced by the German automaker Volkswagen between 2014 and 2020.

== Overview ==
Previewed as the Volkswagen Sportsvan concept at the 2013 Frankfurt Motor Show and positioned below the seven-seater Touran in the company's product catalogue, it is derived from the Golf Mk7 and based on the MQB platform, and was also assembled at the Wolfsburg plant alongside the standard Golf hatchback. At 4,338 mm long, the Sportsvan is 134 mm longer than the Golf Plus that it replaces, 83 mm longer than the Golf hatchback, and 224 mm shorter than the Golf Estate.

Compared with the boot of its predecessor, the capacity is increased by 76 litres to 500 litres with the back seats at their rear-most position (versus the Golf's 380 litres and the Estate's 605 litres). Moving the rear seats forwards increases the luggage capacity to 590 litres, while folding the rear seats liberates up to 1,520 litres of room. The front passenger seat can also optionally fold fully forward, creating a load space which is up to 2,484 mm long.

Like the Golf, the Golf SV comes with many standard and optional safety systems. These include a standard automatic post-collision braking system, which automatically brakes the vehicle after a collision to reduce kinetic energy significantly and thus minimise the chance of a second impact, and a PreCrash system (Proactive Occupant Protection) which, on detecting the possibility of an accident, pre-tensions seatbelts and closes the windows and sunroof, leaving just a small gap, to ensure the best possible protection from the airbags.

A first for the Golf SV is a blind spot monitor, dubbed Side Scan, with an assistant for exiting parking spaces. This monitors the area behind and to the sides of the vehicle, ensuring easier and safer egress when reversing from a parking bay. It was packaged as an option together with Lane Assist.

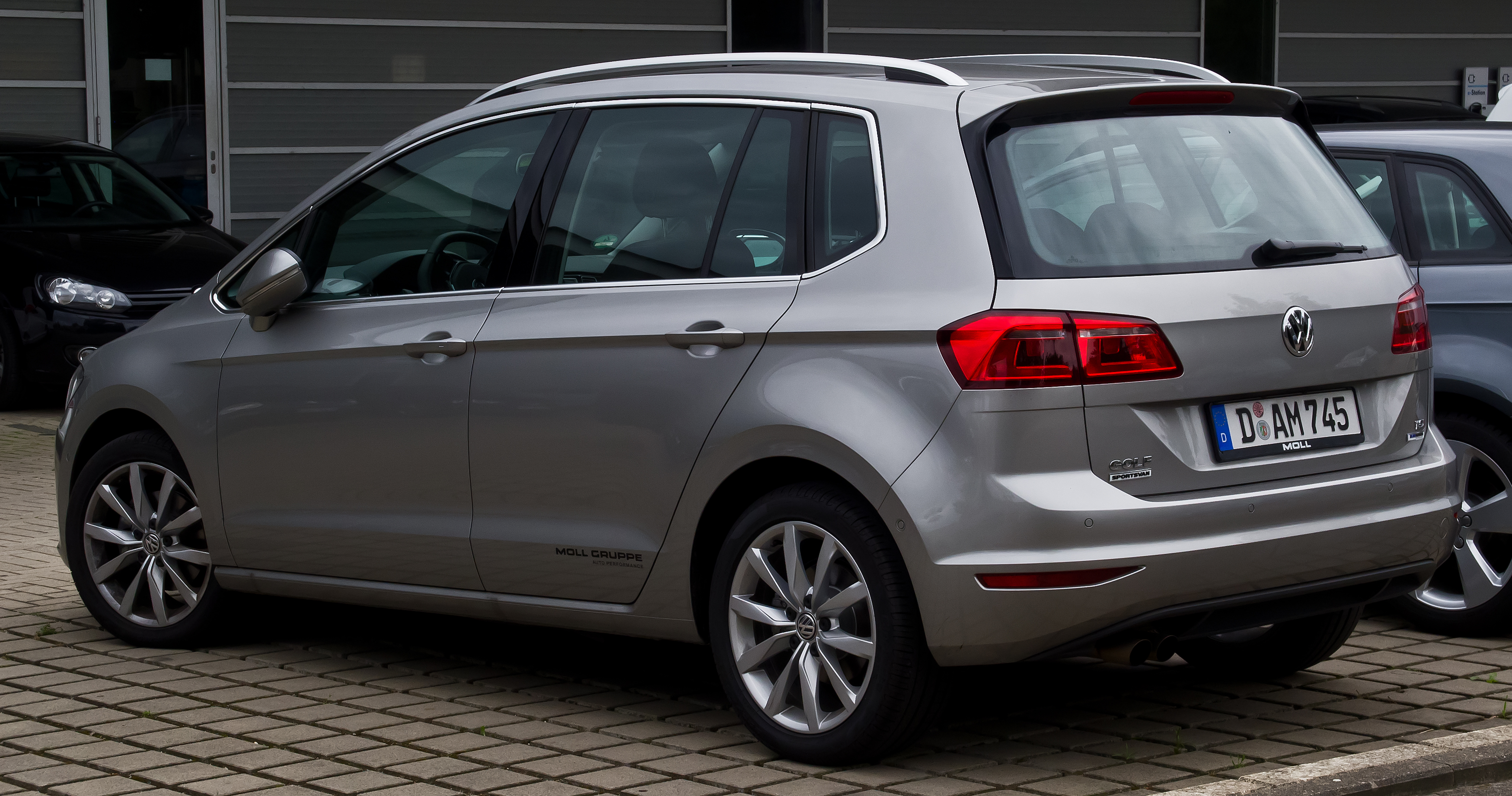
Rear view

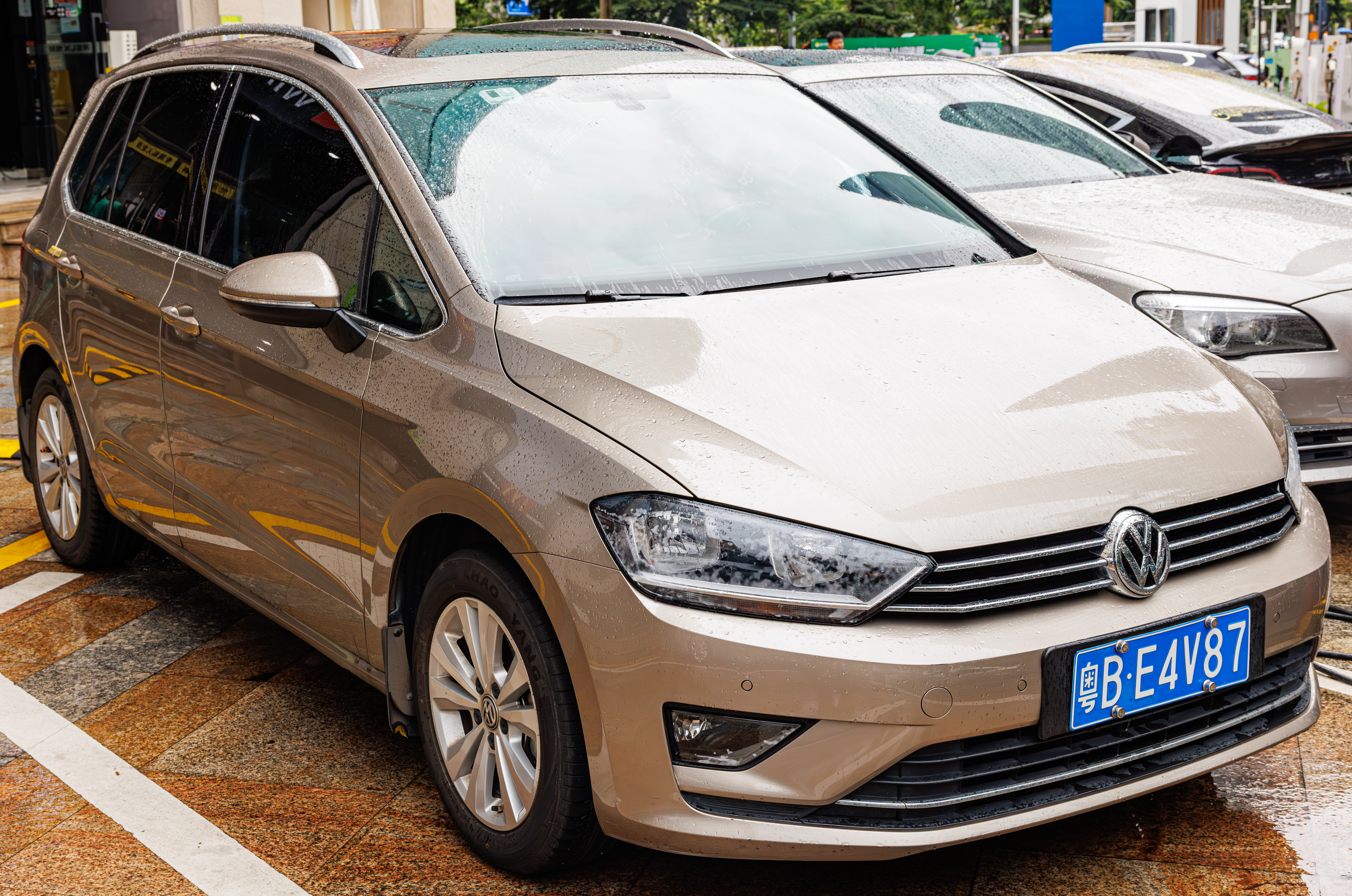
2016 Golf Sportsvan (pre-facelift, China)

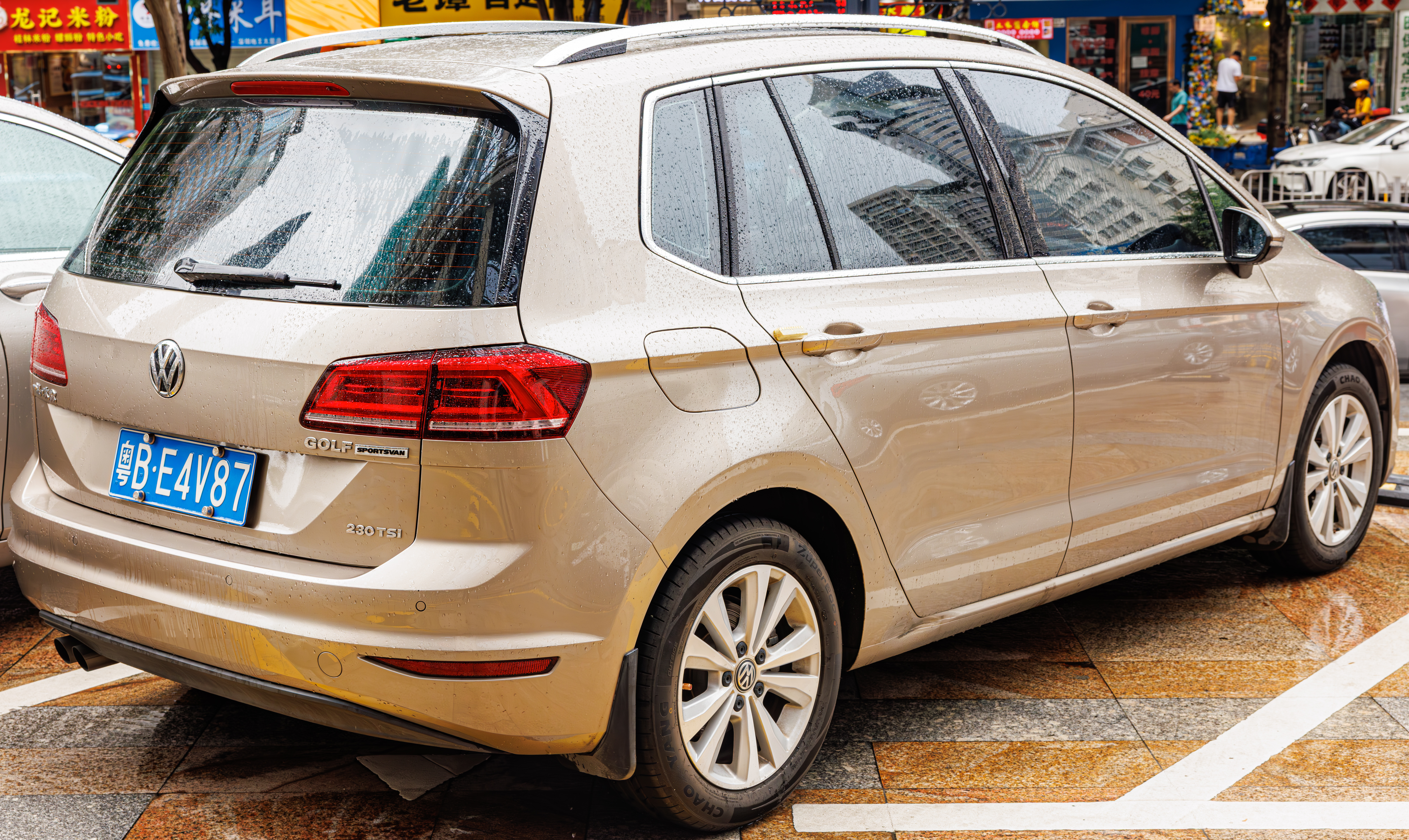
2016 Golf Sportsvan (pre-facelift, China)

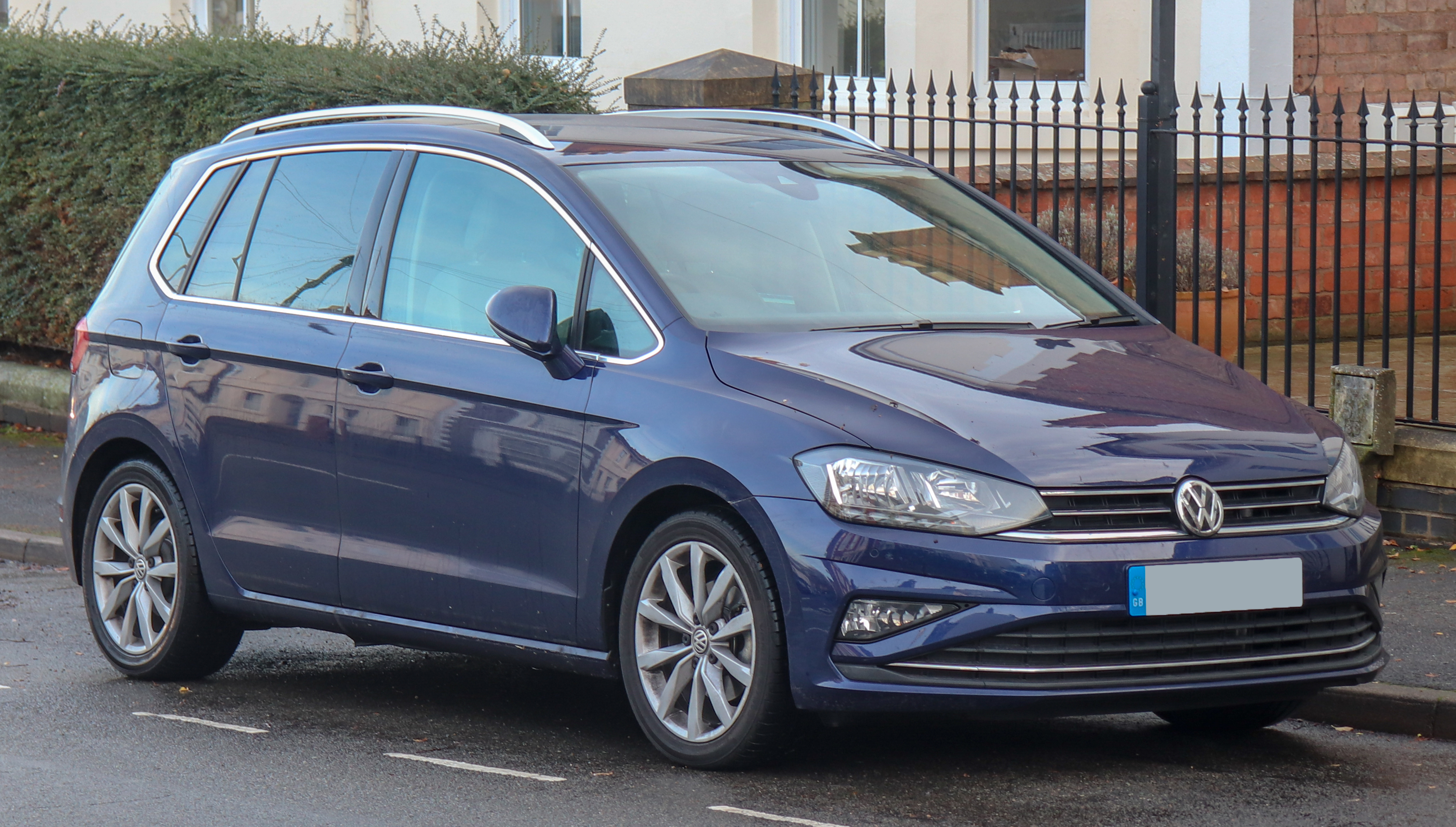
2018 Golf Sportsvan (facelift)

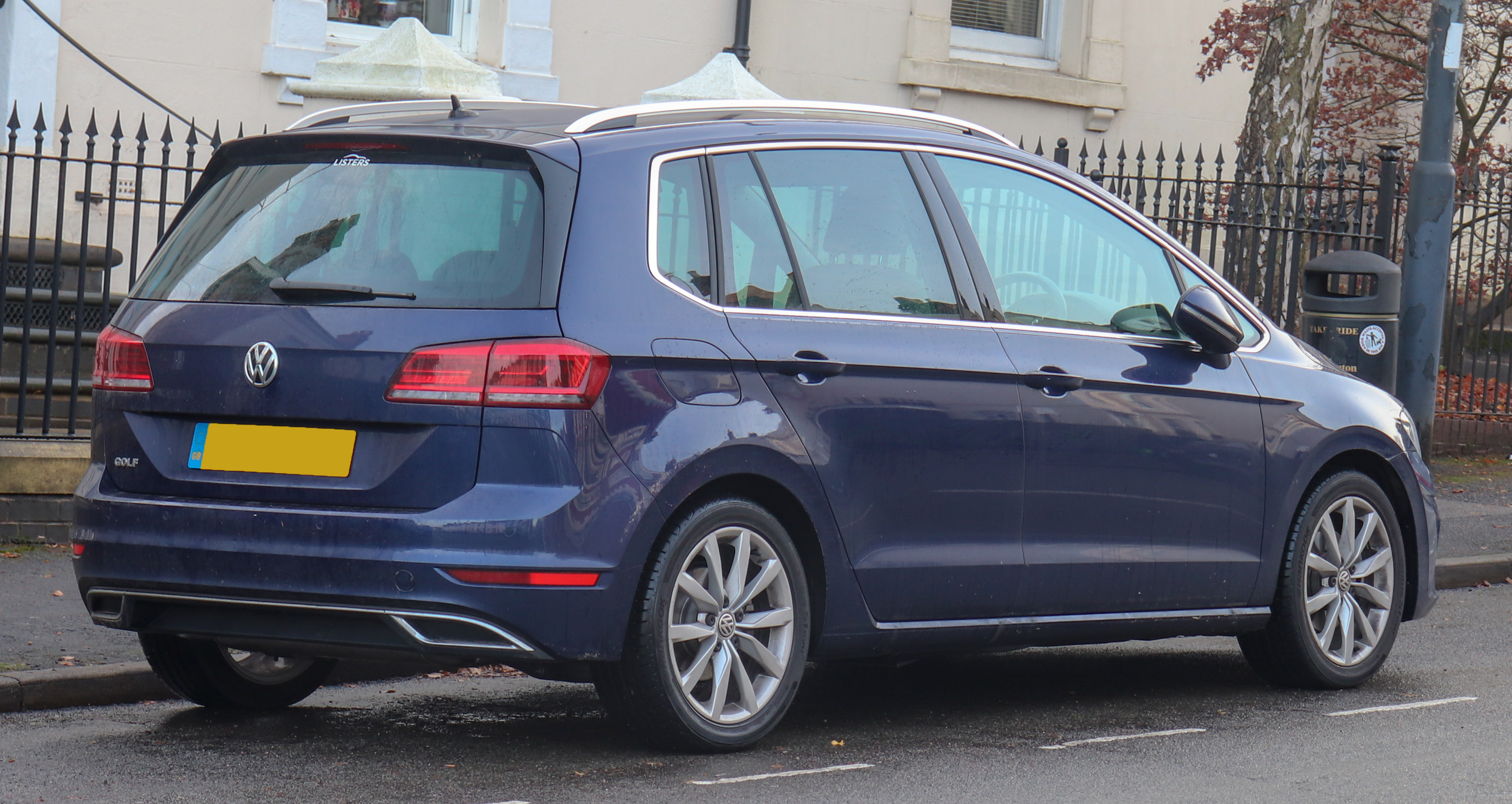
2018 Golf Sportsvan (facelift)

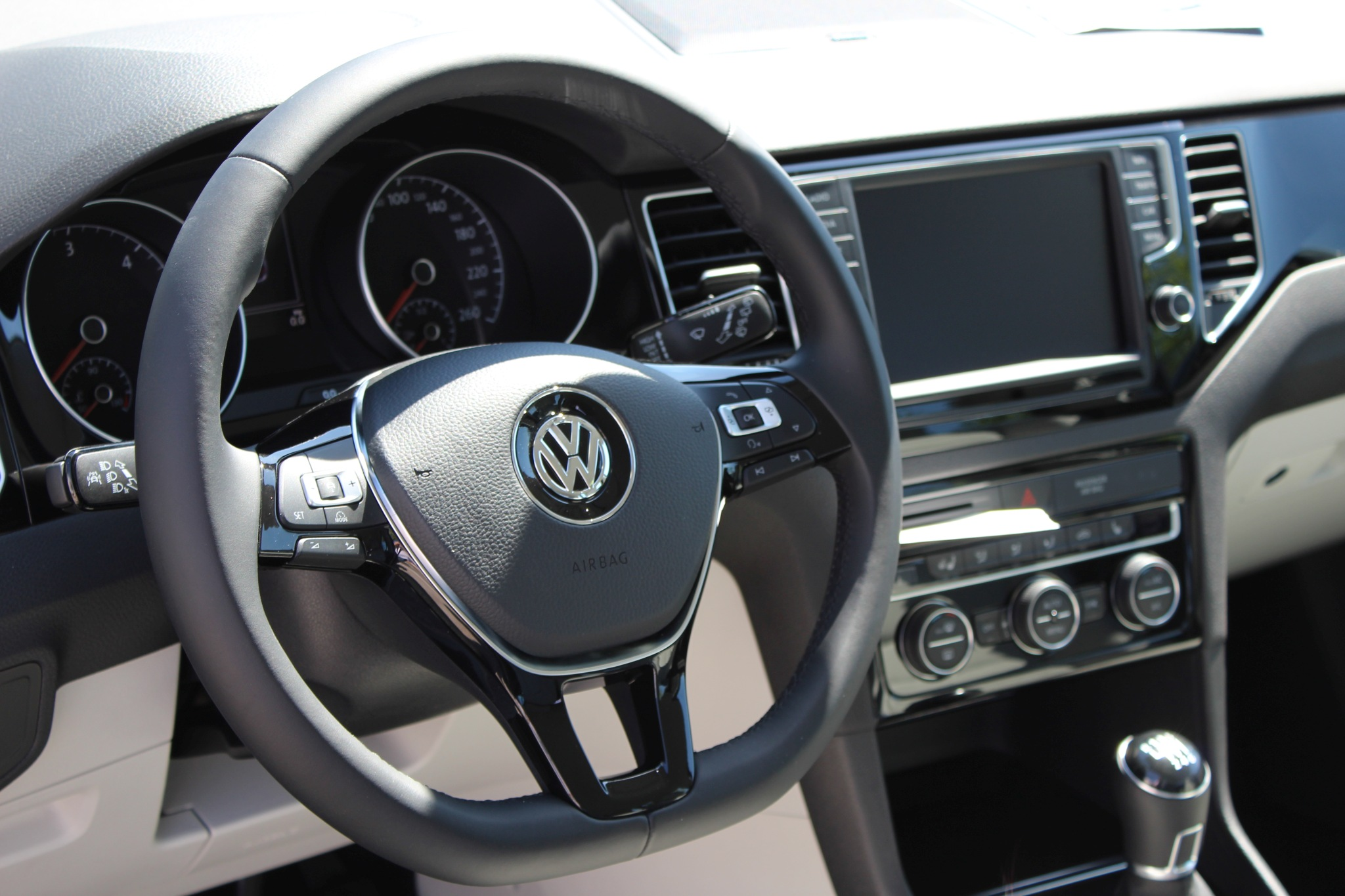
Interior

== Powertrain ==
Powering the SV is a range of petrol and diesel engines, all of which incorporate Stop/Start and battery regeneration systems. There are two turbocharged 1.2-litre petrol engines with 85 and 105 PS; two 1.4-litre turbocharged petrol engines with 125 and 150 PS; and three turbodiesels: a 2.0-litre 150 PS, a 1.6-litre 90 PS and a 1.6-litre 110 PS. When fitted in the Golf SV BlueMotion, this last engine is expected to return fuel economy of 76.3 mpg and emit 95 g/km of CO_{2}. All engines apart from the 1.2-litre TSI 85 PS can be ordered with a DSG gearbox.

== Awards ==
- Red Dot Design Award 2015
- IF Product Design Award 2015
