= PCKeeper =

Set of optimization tools for Windows

- Developer: Essentware S.A.
- Initial release: May 8, 2013; 12 years ago
- Stable release: PCKeeper 2.2 / September 2014; 11 years ago
- Operating system: Windows Vista, Windows 7, Windows 8, Windows 10
- Platform: IA-32 and x64
- Available in: English, German, French, Japanese
- License: Proprietary commercial software
- Website: pckeeper.com

PCKeeper is advertised as an optimization services package featuring a set of software utilities for Windows OS owned by Essentware S.A. (company based in Bratislava, Slovakia). It includes 2 separate products for Windows: PCKeeper Live and PCKeeper Antivirus.

PCKeeper was originally developed by Zeobit LLC which was founded in 2009 by Slava Kolomiychuk. PCKeeper was released in September 2010. Kromtech Alliance acquired PCKeeper and MacKeeper from Zeobit in May 2013. In 2015, PCKeeper has changed its legal owners from Kromtech Alliance Corp. to Essentware S.A. Kromtech Alliance has made the decision to focus on the products for Mac users only. Essentware S.A. office registered in Panama. The principal officers and developers of the company remain in Ukraine.

== Exaggerated warning messages ==
Two class action lawsuits have been filed against Kromtech for the Mac OS version of PCKeeper, MacKeeper. The first lawsuit, filed in Illinois, alleges that "Contrary to ZeoBIT's marketing and in-software representations, however, neither the free trial nor the full registered versions of MacKeeper perform any credible diagnostic testing of a user's Mac. Instead, ZeoBIT intentionally designed MacKeeper to invariably and ominously report that the consumer's Mac needs repair and is at-risk due to harmful errors, privacy threats, and other problems, regardless of the computer's actual condition." The second complaint, filed by Holly Yencha of Pennsylvania, alleges that the free starter version of MacKeeper identifies harmless programs as "critical" problems. The complaint claims that "under MacKeeper's reporting algorithm, even brand new computers are in 'critical' condition and require repair by purchasing the full version."

PCKeeper Live is sometimes installed on users' PCs with other partner programs, which can cause unwanted pop-up windows.

== PCKeeper Live ==
PCKeeper Live offers 13 different PC services in 4 categories: Human Assistance (Find & Fix, Geek on Demand, Live Support), Security (Anti-Theft, Data Hider, Shredder, Files Recovery), Cleaning (Disk Cleaner, Disk Explorer, Duplicates Finder, Uninstaller) and Optimization (Context Menu Manager, Startup Manager).

=== Popup ads ===
PCKeeper is sometimes advertised with pop up ads. Many of their pop up ads occur on pornography websites.

=== Reviews ===
PCKeeper Live is rated "Good" (3.5 out of 5) by the PCMag editor, stating "improves PC performance", and "great for novice users", "The utility won't clean your PC as well as Iolo System Mechanic, but considering its accessibility and wallet friendliness, it's one to check out" and "Kromtech PCKeeper Live's human specialists and unique price plans make this tune-up utility worthy of consideration, but rival applications offer better PC improvement".

Techradar.pro rates its 3 out of 5 stars and that noted, that "Overall, PCKeeper is a light-weight tool that won't annoy you with pop-up windows", "When you consider the fact most of PCKeeper Live's optimization features are easily found on most free tools, and that some were simply not useful at all, the price for the Kromtech solution seems unreasonably high." and "Kromtech's 24/7 support is what elevates PCKeeper Live from an overpriced utility program to a tool that even a non-geek can use to optimize his/her computer."

PCKeeper was reviewed by a wide range of tech experts. It was reviewed in Turkish, French, Portuguese, Spanish, German". Review at PCMag thus described PCKeeper Live: "Improves PC performance. Multiple price points. Advice from Microsoft-certified computer specialists. Anti-theft technology". It gained 3,5 out of 5 points."

== PCKeeper Antivirus ==
PCKeeper Antivirus integrates the Avira's Secure Anti-Virus API (SAVAPI), the official interface for Avira’s anti-malware scanning engine. PCKeeper Antivirus does not block malware-hosting URLs or phishing URLs. According to Virus Bulletin, PCKeeper Antivirus PRO has scored 96.1% in RAP tests and set a stability level at Stable. PCKeeper Antivirus got a VB100 award. PCKeeper Antivirus (version 1.x) received 2 OPSWAT Gold Certifications in the Antispyware and Antivirus categories.

The German organization AV-Test.org tested 25 anti-virus programs. The testers found that AhnLab, Microsoft Windows Defender and PCKeeper Antivirus were the lowest performing anti-virus applications for Windows 8.1.

=== Lab testing results ===
| PCKeeper version | date | name of test | award | results | comments |
|---|---|---|---|---|---|
| 2.1.96 | August 2013 | VB100 Single Product Test | VB100 Award | Fair | Not tested in response tests. Stability rated as "Fair". Only submitted for 2 of 12 tests. |
| 2.138 | May 2013 | On-Demand File Detection Test | | 99.4% | 7 false positives (few). Scored 2.5 out of 6 for protection, and 2.5 out of 6 for performance |
| April 10, 2014 | March/April 2014 | AV-TEST Institute Best Antivirus for Windows Home User | | Protection: 2.5 (out of 6.0) Performance 2.5 (out of 6.0) Usability (out of 6.0) | Comparison to other products can be seen at the AV-TEST Institute page: Best Antivirus for Windows Home User |

=== Reviews ===
PCMag rated PCKeeper Antivirus Good (3 out of 5), noting that PCKeeper Antivirus has a "Streamlined, attractive interface. Easy to use for non-techies. Good score in our hands-on malware blocking testing". However, it scored poorly in independent lab testing and the chat based support was "soured by the fact that they served me misinformation." PC Mag concluded "you'd be better off with Panda Free Antivirus 2015, an Editors' Choice for free antivirus. It slightly edged PCKeeper in my own tests and swept the field in lab tests, with high marks across the board. For the same price as PCKeeper, you could have Bitdefender Antivirus Plus 2015 or Kaspersky Anti-Virus (2015), both of which we named Editors' Choice for paid antivirus. Any of these is a better choice."

== Social campaigns ==
In May 2013 PCKeeper let its customers decide how much to pay for the software, launching a pay what you want campaign.

== See also ==
- Antivirus software
