= MacKeeper =

Cleanup utility for macOS

- Developers: Clario Tech FZCO; Kromtech; Zeobit
- Release: October 1, 2010; 16 years ago
- Stable release: 7.8 / September 2026
- Operating system: macOS OS X El Capitan 10.11 or later
- Available in: 18 languages
- List of languages Chinese, Czech, Danish, Dutch, English, Finnish, French, German, Italian, Japanese, Korean, Norwegian, Polish, Portuguese, Russian, Spanish, Swedish, Turkish
- Type: Utility software
- License: Proprietary commercial software
- Website: mackeeper.com

MacKeeper is a utility software for macOS that offers security, cleaning, performance-optimization and privacy features. MacKeeper was first released in 2010, developed by ZeoBIT, later acquired by Kromtech, and is currently owned by Clario Tech, a security software development company.

MacKeeper had a troubled and litigious history under previous ownership. Zeobit settled a class action lawsuit over deceptive advertising and misleading claims, and Kromtech unsuccessfully sued MacKeeper critics. Some versions were difficult to uninstall, and flagged as undesirable by antivirus programs.

== History ==
MacKeeper was first released in 2010 by Zeobit. Versions 1 and 2 received mixed reviews. From the beginning, it was positioned as a multipurpose technology for Mac users - all MacKeeper’s features were categorized as security, cleaning, optimization, and data control tools. A 2011 press release by Avira and ZeoBIT revealed that MacKeeper integrated Avira's antivirus scanning engine. In April 2013, MacKeeper was acquired by Kromtech. Kromtech was closely affiliated with Zeobit, and hired many former Kyiv-based Zeobit employees. In December 2015, security researcher Chris Vickery found that MacKeeper customer data was unsecured and publicly accessible on the internet, exposing the emails, phone numbers, and other information of over 13 million MacKeeper users; Kromtech rapidly secured the customer database.

In 2019, MacKeeper was acquired by a newly-founded company, Clario Tech. In November 2020, Clario released MacKeeper 5, which received 3.5 of 5 star reviews from TechRadar and Macworld. Clario obtained ISO 27001 and AV-TEST certification for the product. This year, MacKeeper was also certified by AppEsteem. The new version includes a VPN, on-demand virus scanning, a memory cleaner, and a disk cleaner.

In 2022, MacKeeper 6 went live with an enhanced set of core features. In March 2024, the latest version was also certified by AV-TEST and received 6/6 for its protection capabilities, 5.5/6 for its performance, and 6/6 for usability. In 2025, MacKeeper 7 went live with support for ARM processors and a new design.

=== Software ===
MacKeeper’s core cleaning features are represented by Safe Cleanup, Duplicates Finder and Smart Uninstaller. They respectively detect and delete junk files, such as logs and cache, without risk of removing vital information; find duplicate files, similar photos, screenshots and remove them while leaving the original files safe; and delete apps correctly by removing any leftovers. The app’s optimization instruments include Memory Cleaner which cleans Mac’s RAM and allows users to control resource-intensive processes; Update Tracker which keeps Mac apps up to date; Login Items tool that allows users to manage programs launching at startup.

== Reception ==
Many antivirus programs classified MacKeeper version 3 as a potentially unwanted program or adware and prompted users to remove it. The official uninstaller "[left] pieces behind", resulting in regular pop-ups to convince users to reinstall the app. Business Insider recommended users avoid or uninstall the product. Both Tom's Guide and Macworld have published how-to guides for deleting the software.

Version 1 & 2 of the program received mixed reviews, with reviewers being divided as to the effectiveness of the software. Some versions of MacKeeper opened a critical security hole in customers' Macs; Kromtech later issued a fix. AV-Comparatives found that MacKeeper warned of "serious" issues on a brand-new clean copy of macOS, which could only be fixed by purchasing the program. This was deemed scareware by cybersecurity journalist Brian Krebs. French news outlet Le Figaro called MacKeeper a scam, and criticized its reliance on "fear". Computerworld described MacKeeper as "a virulent piece of software".

MacKeeper's marketing tactics drew criticism. Zeobit was accused of employing aggressive pop-under ads, planting sockpuppet reviews, and setting up websites to discredit its competitors. In 2015, PCWorld noted that MacKeeper ads were "all over the web", and that Kromtech claimed to be buying 60 million ad impressions a month. MacKeeper was in part promoted by affiliate sellers, who could earn a 50% commission for sales of the app. Some affiliates promoted MacKeeper in adware. After media criticism, Kromtech claimed it revamped its affiliate program.

MacKeeper's usefulness was disputed by tech media; anti-malware, secure erase, backup, encryption, and anti-theft were either built-into macOS or available for free. Top Ten Reviews noted that other Mac anti-malware apps had better detection rates, resulting in a score of 7.5 out of 10. A July 2017 AV-TEST assessment found MacKeeper only detected 85.9 percent of the tested malware. In February 2025, PCMag rated MacKeeper as "Good". In March 2025, MacKeeper received a maximum score of 18 out of 18 in AV-TEST results.

=== Lawsuits ===
In January 2014, a class action lawsuit was filed against Zeobit in Illinois. The lawsuit alleged that "neither the free trial nor the full registered versions of MacKeeper performed any credible diagnostic testing" and reported that a consumer's Mac was in need of repair and was at-risk due to harmful error. In May 2014 a lawsuit was filed against Zeobit in Pennsylvania, alleging that MacKeeper fakes security problems to deceive victims into paying for unneeded fixes. On 10 August 2015, Zeobit settled the lawsuit for US$2 million. Customers who bought MacKeeper before 8 July 2015 could apply to get a refund.

In July 2013 Kromtech sued MacPaw, the developers of CleanMyMac, which was dismissed before the hearing. In 2014, Kromtech sued David A. Cox, who had made a video criticizing MacKeeper; the judge dismissed the case. In July 2016, Kromtech sent a cease and desist letter to Luqman Wadood, a 14-year old technology reviewer who made YouTube videos critical of the app; Luqman said the videos were diplomatic.
