= Driver Steering Recommendation =

Driver Steering Recommendation (DSR) is a feature of the Electronic Stabilisation Program (ESP) system on several Volkswagen Group car models, including the SEAT León Mk2 (Typ 1P), Volkswagen Golf Plus, and Volkswagen Scirocco. The system is supplied by Continental Automotive Systems.

Sensors detect when the car is starting to skid, and the steering's electronic control unit (ECU) provides a prompt to the driver to correct the problem by making the steering wheel move slightly. Since most drivers find the idea of a car steering itself troubling, VW Group stresses that the robotic nudge is merely a suggestion, which the driver is free to override.

== See also ==
- Volkswagen Group PQ35 platform
