= MacPaw =

Ukrainian software company

- Type: Private
- Industry: Software
- Founded: 2008
- Founder: Oleksandr Kosovan
- Headquarters: Kyiv, Ukraine
- Key people: Oleksandr Kosovan (CEO)
- Products: CleanMyMac, Setapp, Gemini, ClearVPN, The Unarchiver, CleanMyPhone, Eney
- Revenue: US$90 million (2024)

MacPaw is a Ukrainian software company based in Kyiv. It was founded in 2008 by Oleksandr Kosovan, who developed the first version of CleanMyMac while studying at the Kyiv Polytechnic Institute.

The company develops software mainly for macOS and iOS. Its products include CleanMyMac, the subscription service Setapp, Gemini, ClearVPN, The Unarchiver and CleanMyPhone. It also operates the Moonlock cybersecurity division and develops the Eney artificial-intelligence assistant.

MacPaw reported revenue of about US$90 million in 2024. CleanMyMac has remained its largest product, accounting for about 80% of revenue in both 2021 and 2025.

== History ==
=== Early years ===
Kosovan created CleanMyMac in 2008 while he was a student at the Kyiv Polytechnic Institute. MacPaw later expanded its range of software for Apple devices and grew into one of Ukraine's larger product-software companies. By 2021, it employed more than 300 people.

In 2016, MacPaw began testing Setapp, a service that gives subscribers access to a catalogue of Mac applications for a monthly fee. It was launched publicly in January 2017.

MacPaw also developed DevMate, a platform for software licensing, updates and analytics. British software company Paddle acquired DevMate in 2017, and MacPaw later invested in Paddle's US$12.5 million Series B funding round.

In July 2017, MacPaw acquired The Unarchiver, a file-extraction utility developed by Dag Ågren.

=== Russian invasion of Ukraine ===
MacPaw remained headquartered in Kyiv after the start of the Russian invasion of Ukraine in February 2022. Most of its customers were in the United States and Europe, while much of its technical infrastructure was hosted outside Ukraine, allowing the company to continue operating.

The war nevertheless disrupted its operations through air raids, power cuts and mobilisation. MacPaw introduced contingency plans for interruptions to internet access and other infrastructure. Fast Company reported on employees working and sheltering in Kyiv during the first weeks of the invasion.

Despite the disruption, MacPaw continued to grow. Its workforce increased by 22% in 2022 and 14% in 2023, reaching more than 540 employees by early 2024. In 2023, it established Moonlock, a cybersecurity division focused on Mac users, and opened an office in Cambridge, Massachusetts.

=== Restructuring and AI ===
In November 2024, MacPaw announced that it would cut about 120 jobs, or roughly 20% of its workforce. Kosovan said the company was under financial pressure and would reduce spending on projects that were no longer considered priorities.

Revenue rose from about US$75 million in 2021 to US$84.9 million in 2023 and about US$90 million in 2024. The group recorded a loss of more than US$10 million in 2024, compared with a US$3.1 million profit the previous year.

Kosovan later said the restructuring reduced annual recurring expenses by about US$7 million and brought the company's cash flow close to break-even.

In 2025, MacPaw introduced Eney, an AI assistant for macOS, and said it wanted to reduce its dependence on CleanMyMac. Later that year, the company described its strategy as a transition towards becoming an "AI-first" company.

In August 2026, MacPaw announced a partnership with Liquid AI to develop technology for running AI models locally on users' devices. The companies planned to use it in Eney and later make parts of the technology available to developers distributing software through Setapp.

== Products and services ==
=== CleanMyMac ===
CleanMyMac is a macOS maintenance utility and MacPaw's first commercial product. It includes tools for removing unnecessary files, managing applications and storage, and detecting malware. It has remained the company's main source of revenue.

=== Setapp ===
Setapp is a subscription-based software service launched in 2017. Subscribers receive access to a catalogue of applications from MacPaw and independent developers rather than purchasing each application separately.

The service later expanded to iOS and business customers. By August 2026, Setapp had more than 150,000 paying subscribers.

=== Other products ===
Other MacPaw products include Gemini, which identifies duplicate files; ClearVPN, a virtual private network service; CleanMyPhone, an iOS photo-management application; and The Unarchiver.

Moonlock, established in 2023, focuses on cybersecurity products and research for Mac users.

== MacPaw Village land dispute ==
In February 2023, Ukrainian authorities searched MacPaw's Kyiv office and Kosovan's home as part of an investigation into land near the village of Tsybli in Kyiv Oblast, where the company was developing an employee recreation complex called MacPaw Village. Authorities alleged irregularities in the use of the land, while MacPaw denied wrongdoing and said the property had been acquired legally and the required permits obtained.

One of the related disputes reached the Supreme Court of Ukraine, which in October 2023 closed the proceedings and left MacPaw as the holder and user of the disputed property.

== See also ==
- Information technology in Ukraine
- Software industry in Ukraine
