= Daniela Rus =

American computer scientist

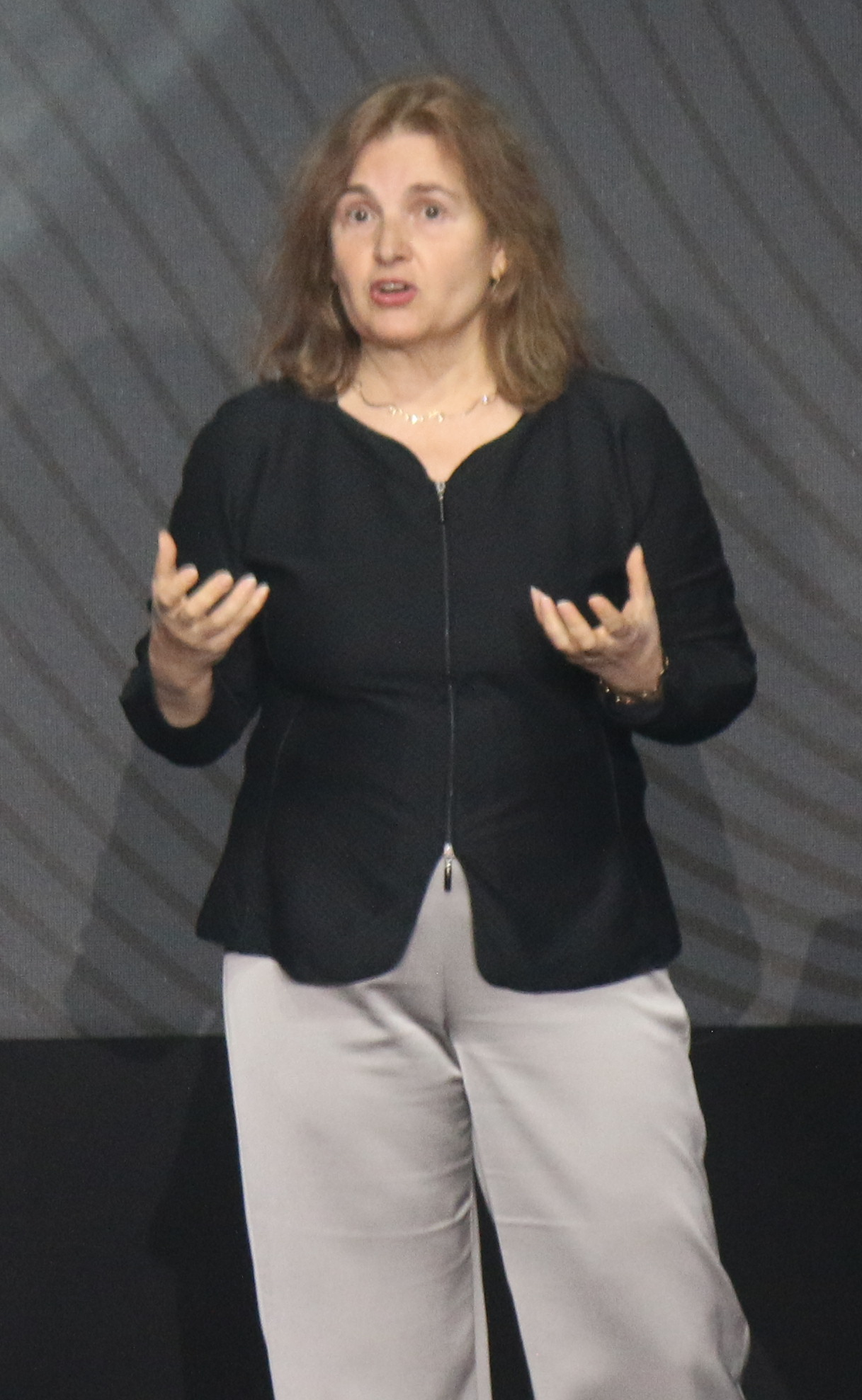
- Rus in 2025
- Born: Cluj-Napoca, Romania
- Citizenship: United States
- Education: University of Iowa (BS); Cornell University (MS, PhD)
- Awards: IEEE Edison Medal (2025); NAS member (2024); AAAS member (2017); NAE member (2015); MacArthur fellow (2002); IEEE fellow (2009); AAAI fellow (2009); ACM Fellow (2015)
- Scientific career
- Fields: Robotics; AI; Computer Science
- Workplaces: Dartmouth College; Massachusetts Institute of Technology
- Thesis: Fine motion planning for dexterous manipulation (1992)
- Doctoral advisor: John Hopcroft
- Doctoral students: Cynthia Sung; Robert Katzschmann

Daniela L. Rus is a Romanian-American computer scientist. She is the MIT Panasonic Professor of Computer Science and director of the MIT Computer Science and Artificial Intelligence Laboratory (CSAIL).

Rus is known for work in robotics and artificial intelligence, including distributed and networked robotics, self-reconfiguring robot systems, soft and bio-inspired robots, computational design and fabrication, human-robot interaction, autonomous systems, and adaptive machine learning. A recurring theme in her research is the integration of robot bodies, computational intelligence, and physical environments. She has described this direction publicly as Physical AI: artificial intelligence embodied in systems that can sense, move, learn, adapt, and act in the real world in a 2024 TED talk.

Her work also includes AI for scientific discovery, including machine-learning and robotics methods for studying nonhuman communication through Project CETI, the Cetacean Translation Initiative. Rus has served as a principal investigator and member of the founding scientific team for Project CETI, which was launched with catalytic support from The Audacious Project and was inspired in part by the whale-song research and conservation legacy of Roger Payne.

Rus is a co-founder of Liquid AI, an MIT CSAIL spinout founded with Ramin Hasani, Mathias Lechner, and Alexander Amini to develop efficient general-purpose AI systems and liquid foundation models. She has also co-founded or advised companies in robotics, transportation, trustworthy AI, and intelligent systems. Her honors include the MacArthur Fellowship, the IEEE Edison Medal, the John Scott Medal, the Engelberger Robotics Award, the High-Tech Award of the Bavarian Minister-President, and elections to the National Academy of Engineering, the National Academy of Sciences, and the American Academy of Arts and Sciences.

Rus was named one of TIME's 100 Most Influential People in AI.

== Biography ==
=== Early life and education ===
Rus was born in Romania and immigrated to the United States with her family. Her father, Teodor Rus, is a computer scientist, and her mother, Elena Rus, is a physicist. She received a Bachelor of Science in computer science and mathematics from the University of Iowa in 1985. She earned a Master of Science in computer science in 1990 and a Ph.D. in computer science in 1993 from Cornell University. Her doctoral advisor was John Hopcroft, and her dissertation was titled Fine Motion Planning for Dexterous Manipulation.

=== Career ===
Rus began her academic career in the Department of Computer Science at Dartmouth College. She joined MIT in 2004 and became director of MIT CSAIL in 2012.

As CSAIL director, she has led one of MIT's largest interdisciplinary computing laboratories and has supported research and translation programs across artificial intelligence, robotics, autonomy, data systems, cybersecurity, privacy, machine learning applications, and industry collaboration. Her research group, the DRL (Distributed Robotics Lab), studies the science of autonomy, including networked and collaborative robots, computational design and fabrication, auditable machine learning, and systems that support people with physical and cognitive tasks.

=== Entrepreneurship ===
Rus has co-founded companies based on robotics and AI research, including Liquid AI, Themis AI, Venti Technologies, and The Routing Company. Liquid AI develops efficient general-purpose AI systems and liquid foundation models. Themis AI focuses on trustworthy and safe AI as well as model uncertainty estimation. Venti Technologies develops autonomous logistics systems for ports, factories, warehouses, and industrial yards, and The Routing Company develops on-demand shared-transit technology.

Rus has also served on corporate boards, including Symbotic, Gartner, and SymphonyAI.

Rus has been a founding member of the MBZUAI Board of Trustees.

=== Organizations ===
Rus is a member of the National Academy of Engineering (NAE), the American Academy of Arts and Sciences (AAAS), the National Academy of Sciences (NAS) and a fellow of ACM, AAAI, and IEEE. She is also a foreign member of Academie Nationale de Medicine (ANM). She was the recipient of an NSF Career award and an Alfred P. Sloan Foundation fellowship, and of the 2002 MacArthur Fellowship.

== Research ==
Rus's research centers on the science and engineering of autonomy for systems that operate in the physical world. Her work treats intelligence as an interaction among body, brain, and world: the body shapes what actions are physically possible; the computational system determines what can be perceived, learned, planned, and controlled; and the environment introduces uncertainty, constraints, and change. This perspective links her contributions in robotics, Physical AI, and AI for scientific discovery.

=== Robotics ===
==== Distributed, networked, and self-organizing robots ====
In distributed and multi-robot systems, Rus has contributed algorithms and systems for coordination, coverage, motion planning, control, and collaboration among multiple machines. This work asks how many machines, each with limited local information, can coordinate to achieve a common goal.

Her group has explored self-reconfiguring modular robots, swarm and collective robotic systems, modular robotic cubes, aerial and ground robot teams, and robotic systems that coordinate through local sensing and communication. In the Roboat and FloatForm projects, small autonomous boats sense, navigate, coordinate, connect, and self-assemble into larger floating structures such as temporary bridges and platforms. The work frames networked robotics as a problem of self-organization: how independent machines can become a coherent collective system.

==== Soft, modular, and bio-inspired robotics ====
Rus has been a pioneer and an early contributor to soft robotics and bio-inspired robot systems. Her group has investigated robots made from compliant and unconventional materials, including silicone, paper, and edible materials, as alternatives to rigid industrial machines. Representative systems include ingestible origami robots for potential medical tasks inside the body, soft robotic fish for underwater observation, soft manipulators, modular robotic systems, and robots inspired by animal movement.

This work has contributed to a broader definition of robots as machines that may be soft, small, foldable, modular, underwater, medical, or environmentally embedded, rather than necessarily humanoid or industrial in form. The underlying research question is how morphology, materials, sensing, and control together determine a machine's intelligence and capability.

==== Computational design and fabrication ====
Rus has also worked on computational design and fabrication, including methods that combine algorithms, materials, manufacturing processes, sensing, and control to generate customized robots and functional devices. Her group has studied robot compilers, printable robots, programmable materials, sensorized structures, and methods for task-driven co-optimization of robot bodies and controllers.

This research treats robot design as a computational problem: how software can help specify not only a robot's behavior, but also aspects of its body, actuation, sensing, materials, and fabrication. It connects robotics to design automation, computational fabrication, materials science, and AI-assisted engineering.

==== Human-robot interaction and assistive systems ====
Rus's work in human-robot interaction examines how people can communicate with, teach, correct, and collaborate with intelligent machines. Her group has studied interfaces based on demonstrations, gestures, wearable sensors, muscle signals, and brain signals, with the goal of developing robots adapt to people rather than requiring people to adapt to robots.

Applications include robot assistants for physical tasks, wearable technologies for navigation or communication, autonomous and assistive mobility systems, collaborative robots for manufacturing and healthcare, and systems for correcting robot behavior during shared tasks.

==== Physical AI and efficient on-device intelligence ====
A second major thread of Rus's work concerns Physical AI: artificial intelligence that is embedded in machines and devices that sense, move, learn, adapt, and act in the physical world. In a 2024 TED talk, she described the convergence of AI and robotics as enabling AI to move beyond digital confines and engage dynamically with the real world, a direction she frames as Physical AI or physical intelligence.

Physical AI places different demands on machine learning than many purely digital applications. A robot, vehicle, medical device, drone, or scientific instrument may need to operate locally, with low latency, limited energy, changing conditions, privacy constraints, and safety requirements. Rus has argued that measures of progress in AI beyond model size include efficiency, adaptability, inspectability, and how much useful intelligence a system can deliver per watt.

One line of work in this area is liquid neural networks, developed with collaborators including Ramin Hasani, Mathias Lechner, Alexander Amini, and Radu Grosu. Inspired in part by compact biological nervous systems, liquid networks are continuous-time models whose internal dynamics can adapt as new inputs arrive. They have been applied to sequential decision-making and autonomous systems that must respond to changing physical environments.

This research helped lead to Liquid AI, an MIT CSAIL spinout co-founded by Rus, Hasani, Lechner, and Amini. Liquid AI develops efficient general-purpose AI systems and liquid foundation models, with an emphasis on capable, aligned, trustworthy, and compute-efficient AI that can operate closer to devices and real-world applications.

==== AI for scientific discovery ====
Rus has also worked on AI as a scientific instrument for observing and understanding complex natural systems. In this framing, AI does not replace scientific inquiry, but extends it by detecting structure in data that is too large, subtle, or multidimensional for unaided human perception.

Rus is involved in Project CETI, an interdisciplinary scientific and conservation initiative that combines machine learning, robotics, biology, linguistics, cryptography, and ocean science to study sperm whale communication. Public descriptions of the project identify Rus as a principal investigator in machine learning and robotics, and The Audacious Project describes her as one of the experts involved in the project team led by David Gruber.

Project CETI builds on a lineage of whale-song research associated with Roger Payne, whose recordings of humpback whales helped inspire modern whale conservation. CETI was formed in 2020 with catalyst funding from The Audacious Project and aims to use advanced machine learning and gentle robotic sensing to listen to and analyze sperm whale communication in behavioral and social context.

In 2024, Project CETI researchers proposed a sperm whale phonetic alphabet based on machine-learning analysis of thousands of codas in social context. The result did not translate whale language, but it identified contextual and combinatorial structure in sperm whale communication and illustrated how AI can reveal patterns in nonhuman communication systems.

=== Professional service ===
Rus has served on advisory and governing bodies in science and technology, including the Defense Innovation Board and the Global Partnership on Artificial Intelligence. She has also served in roles connected to the National Academy of Engineering, the American Academy of Arts and Sciences, and the National Academy of Sciences, and was named to the White House Science Council (PCAST) in 2020.

== Honors and awards ==
A select list of her awards include:

- 2026 TIME 100 in AI
- 2026 Bavarian Academy of Sciences and Humanities High Tech Prize
- IEEE Edison Medal
- Foreign Member, French Academy of Medicine
- 2024 Awarded the John Scott Medal
- 2024 Elected member of the National Academy of Sciences
- 2023 IEEE Robotics and Automation Technical Award
- 2022 Schmidt Futures' AI2050 Fellow
- 2021 Elected fellow of the American Association for the Advancement of Science2020 named to White House science council
- 2020 IJCAI John McCarthy Award
- 2019 Elected fellow of the IEEE
- 2018 IEEE Pioneer in Robotics and Automation Award
- 2017 Engelberger Robotics Award
- 2017 Forbes "Incredible Women Advancing AI Research
- 2017 Elected member of the American Academy of Arts and Sciences
- 2015 Elected member of the National Academy of Engineering
- 2015 Elected fellow of the Association for Computing Machinery
- 2009 Elected fellow of the Association for the Advancement of Artificial Intelligence (AAAI)
- 2002 Awarded the MacArthur Fellowship ("genius grant")

== Books ==
- Daniela Rus with Adam Conner-Simons, Computing the Future: A Decade of Innovation at MIT CSAIL, Cambridge, MIT Press, 2023, ISBN 979-8-218-27291-3.
- Daniela Rus and Gregory Mone, The Heart and the Chip: Our Bright Future with Robots, New York, W. W. Norton & Company, 2024, ISBN 978-1-324-05023-0.
- Daniela Rus and Gregory Mone, The Mind's Mirror: Risk and Reward in the Age of AI, New York, W. W. Norton & Company, 2024, ISBN 978-1-324-07932-3.
