= ASRock M8 =

Mini-ITX barebones computer kit

The ASRock M8 is a Mini-ITX barebones computer kit that was created by ASRock in collaboration with BMW Designworks. There are currently two variations of the M8. The first release (2013) is known as the M8 Series, while the updated (2015) version is known as the M8 Series (Z97).

== Awards ==
In 2013, the M8 was awarded the 2013 Chicago Good Design Award. The following year it received an iF Product Design Award and later tested on a Computex d&i Award. In 2015, the M8 received the Taiwan Excellence Award from the Taiwan External Trade Development Council.

== Specifications ==
Both editions of the M8 measure 372 mm wide, 123 mm tall, and 400 mm long. They have 8 USB 3.0 ports, 4 USB 2.0 ports, a HDMI and DisplayPort video output, WiFi 802.11 AC capability, an Intel Gigabit LAN port, along with a standard 3.5mm headphone jack and microphone jack.

At its core, the October 2013 edition of the M8 comes with a custom BMW designed chassis, a slim line optical drive, an ASRock Z87-M8 motherboard, and a 450W Silverstone SFX power supply. Tom's Hardware reviewed this edition of the M8, citing that they had run into issues with thermal throttling on the system. These issues were resolved by turning the bottom fans into intake fans, while the top fans were flipped into exhaust fans. They also cut up any wire sleeves within the system. In the end, there was a reported a decrease in CPU temperature by 20 °C.

The 2015 refresh of the M8 comes with an updated AsRock Z97-M8 motherboard that supports Intel's Broadwell architecture and a 600W SFX power supply.
