= Cynthia Sung =

American roboticist

Cynthia Rueyi Sung
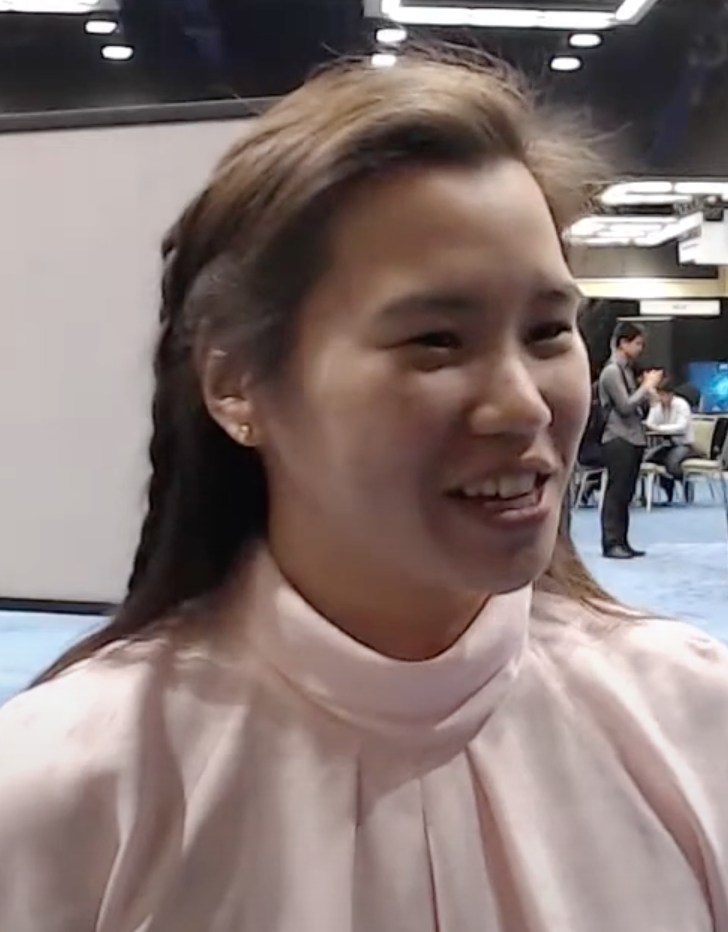
- Sung in 2015
- Education: Rice University (BS); Massachusetts Institute of Technology (PhD)
- Scientific career
- Fields: Robotics
- Workplaces: University of Pennsylvania
- Thesis: Computational design of foldable robots via composition (2016)
- Doctoral advisor: Daniela Rus
- Website: sung.seas.upenn.edu

Cynthia Rueyi Sung is an American roboticist. Her research field is foldable robots. She serves as an Associate Professor of Mechanical Engineering & Applied Mechanics at the University of Pennsylvania, with secondary appointments in Computer and Information Science and in Electrical and Systems Engineering, and is a member of the university's General Robotics, Automation, Sensing and Perception (GRASP) Laboratory.

== Biography ==
=== Early life and education ===
Sung learned origami from her mother as a child, and became interested in robotics as a high school student after following the explorations of the Mars rovers Opportunity and Spirit.

Sung received a Bachelor of Science with a major in mechanical engineering from Rice University in 2011 and a Doctor of Philosophy in electrical engineering and computer science from the Massachusetts Institute of Technology in 2016. Her doctoral dissertation was titled "Computational design of foldable robots via composition", and her doctoral advisor was Daniela Rus.

=== Career ===
As a student at MIT, Sung led a team developing the Robogami system, making it easy for beginners to design and 3D print robots by putting them together from flat parts folded at hinged connections, and she continues to develop the system after moving to the university of Pennsylvania, incorporating improved motion and control capabilities into the system.

She has developed a technique of "additive self-folding", in which robots are initially created as long flat strips of a self-folding material, which arranges itself into the desired shape of a robot when placed into hot water. For her work in this area, Popular Mechanics gave her one of their 2017 Breakthrough Awards.

In 2017, the American Society of Mechanical Engineers named Sung to represent the society in the New Faces of Engineering program. Sung was the 2020 winner of the Johnson & Johnson Women in STEM^{2}D Scholars Award in Manufacturing, for her work in foldable robotics and their applications in healthcare and medicine. She and her coauthors won the IEEE ICRA Best Paper Award on Mechanisms and Design for their work on aerial vehicles with foldable wings that can reshape themselves for both fixed-wing and quadrotor flight.

In 2019, the National Science Foundation gave Sung a CAREER Award for the project "Computational Design for Robust Legged Robots".
