= CleanMyMac =

Maintenance and optimisation utility for macOS

- Developer: MacPaw Way Ltd.
- Release: 2008
- Stable release: 5.5.7 / July 22, 2026
- Operating system: macOS Big Sur or higher
- Platform: macOS
- Available in: 12 languages
- Type: Utility software
- License: Trialware, Software as a service, proprietary commercial software
- Website: macpaw.com/cleanmymac

CleanMyMac is a macOS maintenance and optimisation utility developed by MacPaw first released in 2008. The software is designed to optimize system performance by removing unnecessary files and managing disk space.

As of 2023, the software has been downloaded over 20 million times and has received multiple awards, including the Red Dot Design Award, iF Design Award, the UX Design Award and Stevie Award.

== History ==
CleanMyMac was launched in 2008, with its initial code developed by Oleksandr Kosovan, CEO of MacPaw.

Company's major releases launched in 2015, 2018 and 2024. By 2018, CleanMyMac had gained more than 5 million users.

In 2020, the software received an iF Design Award. In 2021, it received the Red Dot Design Award and added support for Apple Silicon processors. In 2022, the software was nominated for Webby Awards. In 2023, MacPaw expanded its operations, opening an office in Boston in addition to an existing office in Kyiv.

In 2024, MacPaw released an updated version of CleanMyMac and introduced CleanMyPhone.

In January 2025, it launched CleanMyMac Business, a device management service for small and medium-sized enterprises (SMEs). However, the company announced in January 2026 that the service would be discontinued in July 2026.

The company received Webby Awards nominations (2022; 2025), a Stevie Award (2025), and an iF Design Award (2026).

== Features ==
CleanMyMac offers features aimed at maintaining and optimizing macOS systems. It includes tools for cleaning disk space and optimizing performance, as well as features for protecting user privacy, updating applications, uninstalling software, and detecting malware and adware. The software's malware removal functionality is powered by MacPaw's proprietary Moonlock Engine.

Key features include the ability to clear unused system files, log files, and temporary files. Additionally, the software provides optimization tools such as maintenance scripts, disk repair functions, and options for resetting system indexes and databases.

Software modules include Smart Care, Cleanup, Protection, Performance, Applications, My Clutter and Assistant. The Smart Care feature addresses system junk removal, malware detection, and RAM cleanup in a single process. In 2025, the software added a Cloud Cleanup feature for managing files stored in connected cloud services.

== See also ==
- Disk utility
- Operating system
- Logical volume manager
- Utility software
- MacKeeper
