= Zeobit =

Software Company

ZeoBIT LLC
- Type: Private company
- Industry: Security software; Computer software
- Founded: September 2009; 17 years ago in the United States
- Founder: Slava Kolomiychuk
- Headquarters: Sunnyvale, California, United States
- Area served: United States
- Products: MacKeeper, PCKeeper
- Website: zeobit.com (archived)

Zeobit LLC (stylized as ZeoBIT) was a technology and software company formed in 2009 by CEO Slava Kolomiychuk and located in Sunnyvale, California. The company specialized in computer security software and internet security. As of December 2016, it is no longer in business.

Zeobit is best known for the bundled utility software MacKeeper. The software has received mixed reviews with reviewers being very divided as to the effectiveness of the product.

== History ==
Zeobit LLC was incorporated in September 2009 in the US State of California by Slava Kolomiychuk. Zeobit has a management headquarters in Sunnyvale, California and partnership offices in Europe and Asia that house developers and the customer support. In March 2010 their first product, MacKeeper (for macOS) was released and in September 2010 PCKeeper (for Microsoft Windows) was released.

On May 13, 2010, the first beta version of MacKeeper, version 0.8, was released.

On October 4, 2010, PCKeeper (MacKeeper's equivalent for Windows PCs) (version 1.1.48) was released.

On October 26, 2010, Zeobit released MacKeeper 1.0.

On January 30, 2012, MacKeeper 2.0 was released with updates in security, data control, cleaning and optimization.

In 2014, a Pennsylvania woman filed a class action lawsuit against Zeobit LLC, claiming that the company's computer security program identifies problems that don't exist and generates false error messages to scare users into purchasing an upgrade. (see Holly Yencha, et al. v. Zeobit LLC, Case No. 2:13-cv-00578, in the U.S. District Court for the Western District of Pennsylvania.) According to the complaint filed in US District court, "Once installed, MacKeeper prompts the user to conduct a diagnostic scan", the MacKeeper class action lawsuit says. "This scan purportedly detects errors that lead to the problems identified in Zeobit's marketing materials (i.e., performance issues, security and privacy threats)—problems that MacKeeper is supposedly designed to fix." However, the Zeobit class action lawsuit alleges that after the diagnostic scan is completed, MacKeeper reports that it identified thousands of issues that cause the computer to be in "critical" condition. While the trial version of MacKeeper purports to "fix" a limited number of the issues, customers are encouraged to purchase a full, registered version of the security software to fully repair the computer. Yencha alleges that neither the free trial nor the full versions of MacKeeper perform reliable diagnostic testing of the computer. "Instead, Zeobit intentionally designed MacKeeper to invariably and ominously report that a user's Mac needs repair and is at-risk due to harmful (but fabricated) errors, privacy threats, and other computer problems, regardless of the computer's actual condition", the class action lawsuit alleges. The Class Action was settled in 2015 with no admission of wrongdoing and customers were given refunds.

== Products ==
=== MacKeeper ===
MacKeeper is utility software for macOS that claims to provide tools for security, cleaning, optimization and data control. MacKeeper and Zeobit were the official sponsors of the MacWorld / iWorld expo in San Francisco, California in 2011 & 2012. It was acquired by Kromtech Alliance Corp in May 2013.

MacKeeper is often criticized for unethical marketing tactics, including pop-up advertising and buying domain names similar to the names of other antivirus programs. Zeobit claims their affiliates were responsible for the advertising accused as unethical. MacKeeper is sometimes referred to as a potentially unwanted program and is detected by some antivirus programs.

=== PCKeeper ===
PCKeeper is a bundle of most important system utilities for performing different tasks on the PС, such as antivirus, data control and optimization tools, drive clean-up utilities and much more. According to Virus Bulletin, PCKeeper has scored 91.9% in RAP test and was listed as number 6 antivirus in the world. It was acquired by Kromtech Alliance Corp in May 2013.

=== ZeoDisk ===
The ZeoDisk project is a cloud storage solution that will also be integrated in to the existing Zeobit products.

== Ratings and reviews ==
Zeobit was a member of the Better Business Bureau. It had an F rating, due to complaints about its advertising and the quality of its products.
