= Robert Katzschmann =

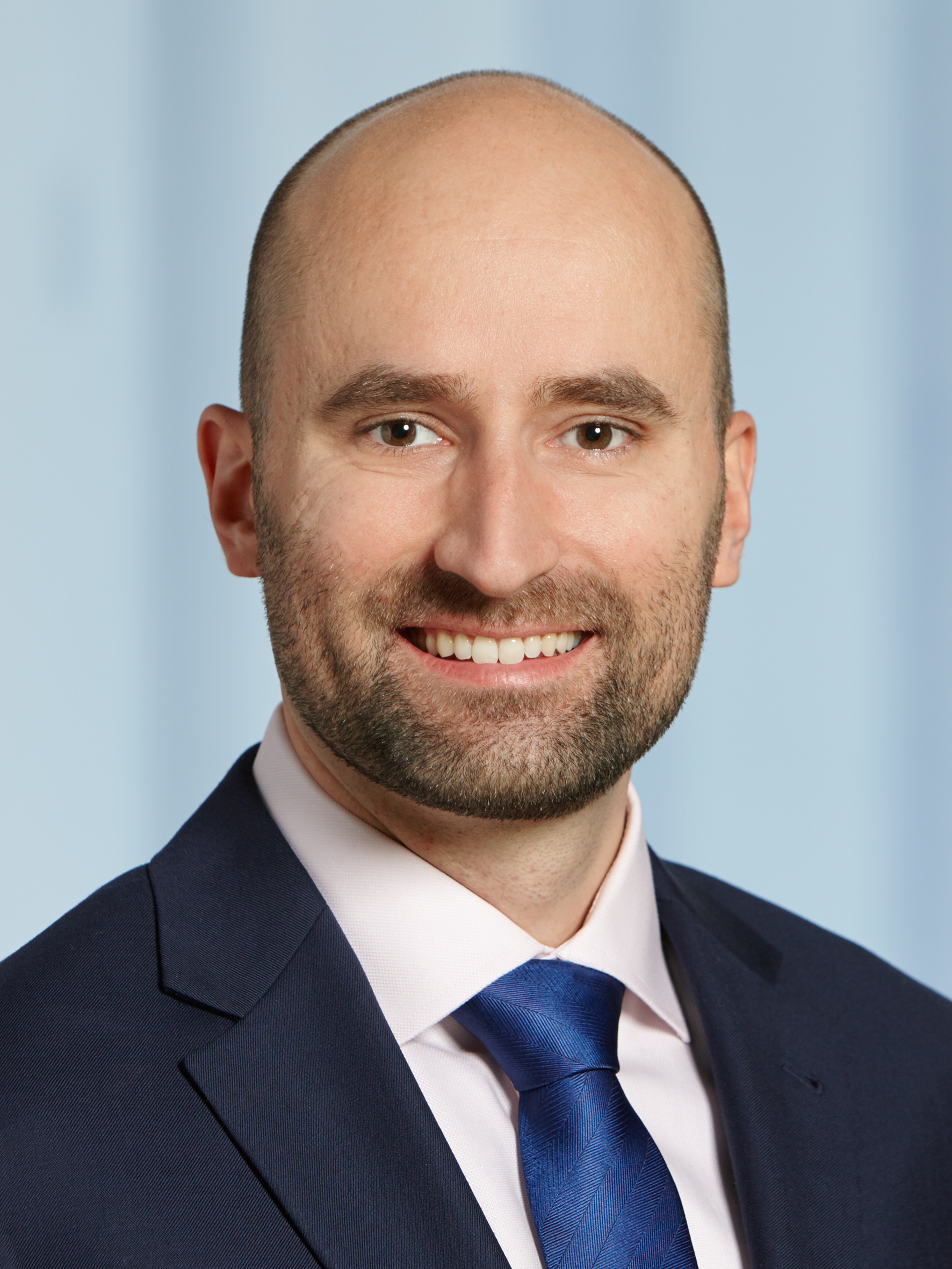
- Born: 1986 (age 39–40)
- Citizenship: Germany
- Education: Massachusetts Institute of Technology (PhD); Stanford University (MS thesis); Karlsruhe Institute of Technology (Diplom-Ingenieur)
- Known for: SoFi (soft robotic fish); Vision-controlled jetting for 3D printing; Soft robotic manipulators
- Scientific career
- Fields: Soft robotics; Machine learning
- Thesis: Building and Controlling Fluidically Actuated Soft Robots: From Open Loop to Model-based Control (2018)
- Doctoral advisor: Daniela Rus
- Website: robert.katzschmann.de

Robert K. Katzschmann (born 1986) is a German roboticist and professor of robotics at ETH Zurich, where he heads the Soft Robotics Lab. He led the development of SoFi, an autonomous soft robotic fish described in "Science Robotics" in 2018, which was covered by The New York Times, The Wall Street Journal, Reuters, BBC, National Geographic, and other international outlets. He has been a TED Fellow since 2022.

== Education ==
Katzschmann received a Diplom-Ingenieur in Mechanical Engineering with a specialization in Mechatronics and Microsystems Technology from the Karlsruhe Institute of Technology (KIT) in 2013. He completed his master's thesis at the Artificial Intelligence Laboratory at Stanford University in 2012–2013.

He earned his Ph.D. with the thesis "Building and controlling fluidically actuated soft robots: from open loop to model-based control" in Mechanical Engineering from the Massachusetts Institute of Technology (MIT) in 2018, working at the Computer Science and Artificial Intelligence Laboratory (CSAIL) under the supervision of Daniela Rus.

== Career ==
From 2012 to 2013, Katzschmann worked at Auris Surgical Robotics (now part of Johnson & Johnson), where he engineered robotic eye surgery and the first version of the MONARCH QUEST biopsy systems. After completing his doctorate, Katzschmann worked as an Applied Scientist at Amazon Robotics on Robin and later served as Chief Technology Officer at Dexai Robotics (now Sony AI).

In July 2020, Katzschmann joined ETH Zurich as assistant professor of robotics in the Department of Mechanical and Process Engineering (D-MAVT), where he established the Soft Robotics Lab.

He is also co-founder and scientific advisor of Mimic Robotics, a company developing autonomous dexterous manipulation solutions.

== Research ==
=== SoFi ===
During his doctoral research at MIT CSAIL, Katzschmann led the development of SoFi (Soft Robotic Fish), an autonomous underwater robot with a soft silicone body that uses hydraulic actuation to swim alongside real fish. During test dives at the Rainbow Reef in Fiji, SoFi swam at depths of more than 15 meters for up to 40 minutes, capturing high-resolution video of marine life.

The project was described by The New York Times as potentially providing "biologists a fish's-eye view of animal interactions in changing marine ecosystems." The work was covered by The New York Times, The Wall Street Journal, National Geographic, Reuters, BBC, Wired, CNN, NPR, IEEE Spectrum, Scientific American, and other outlets.

=== 3D-printed robotic hand ===
In 2023, Katzschmann's team at ETH Zurich published a study in Nature journal describing a vision-controlled inkjet 3D printing system capable of printing a robotic hand with bones, ligaments, and tendons made of different polymers in a single process. The work was covered by Nature News and other scientific outlets.

=== Musculoskeletal robots ===
In 2024, Katzschmann and collaborators reported bio-inspired musculoskeletal robotic systems that use electrohydraulic artificial muscles arranged in antagonistic pairs to mimic biological actuation. In Nature Communications, the team described an electrohydraulic musculoskeletal robotic leg designed for agile and energy-efficient locomotion.

Related work published in Science Advances presented low-voltage electrohydraulic actuators intended to function as artificial muscles for untethered soft robotic systems.

== Awards and honors ==
- Best Paper Award 2024, Robotics and Automation Letters (RA-L)
- Sustainability Gold Award for most sustainable lab practices at ETH Zurich
- TED Fellow (2022)
- Outstanding Paper Award, IEEE RoboSoft, Seoul, South Korea (2019)
- Redtenbacher Prize for Best Result in Diplom-Ingenieur Mechanical Eng., KIT, Germany
- IEEE Robotics and Automation Society Award (2026)
