= Clario Tech =

London-based digital privacy and security company

- Trade name: Clario Tech
- Type: Private
- Industry: Software
- Founded: 2019, UAE
- Area served: Worldwide
- Products: Clario, Clario Anti Spy, MacKeeper
- Number of employees: ~400 (2026)
- Website: https://clario.tech/

Clario Tech is a privately held cross-platform software company founded in 2019 and headquartered in the United Arab Emirates. The company develops and distributes consumer software products for desktop and mobile platforms, including cybersecurity and utility applications. Its products include Clario app, Clario Anti Spy, and MacKeeper, which are available on macOS, iOS, Android, and web-based platforms.

== Company overview ==
Clario Tech employs over 400 employees across multiple locations worldwide, including software developers, marketing specialists, security researchers and customer support.

In 2019, the company announced plans to invest approximately $30 million during 2020 toward development of cybersecurity products.

== Products ==
=== Clario Security ===
Clario Security was launched in January 2020 at the Consumer Electronics Show in Las Vegas.

The company described its product as an online security service combining cybersecurity tools with round-the-clock human support through a single interface. The application was reviewed by several publications, including the Evening Standard, which described it as the “Uber of cybersecurity".

Clario later introduced a public 24-hour IT support hotline for users experiencing technology-related issues.

In December 2020, the product received AV-TEST certification and was included in the honourable mentions list for privacy-focused tools at Product Hunt's Golden Kitty Awards.

=== MacKeeper ===
MacKeeper is utility software that offers system cleaning, privacy features and an antivirus for macOS. Clario Tech has become the owner of the MacKeeper software since 2019 with aim to accelerate the transformation of MacKeeper.

=== Clario Anti Spy ===
Clario Anti Spy is a mobile application designed to detect and prevent digital stalking, phone spying and unauthorized surveillance. The app helps users identify suspicious activity such as hidden spyware, abnormal device behavior or linked devices on messaging platforms. Clario Anti Spy provides users with privacy tips, scanning tools and guidance to enhance their digital security and regain control over their devices. It is available for download on both iOS and Android platforms.

== Clario cybersecurity research ==
Clario Tech has undertaken numerous pieces of research into cybersecurity trends in 2020 and 2021. These include "Which Company Uses the Most of Your Data?", "The State of Cybercrime in US and UK", "Cybercrime Hotspots" and many more.
