= Volkswagen Golf Plus =

Volkswagen car model

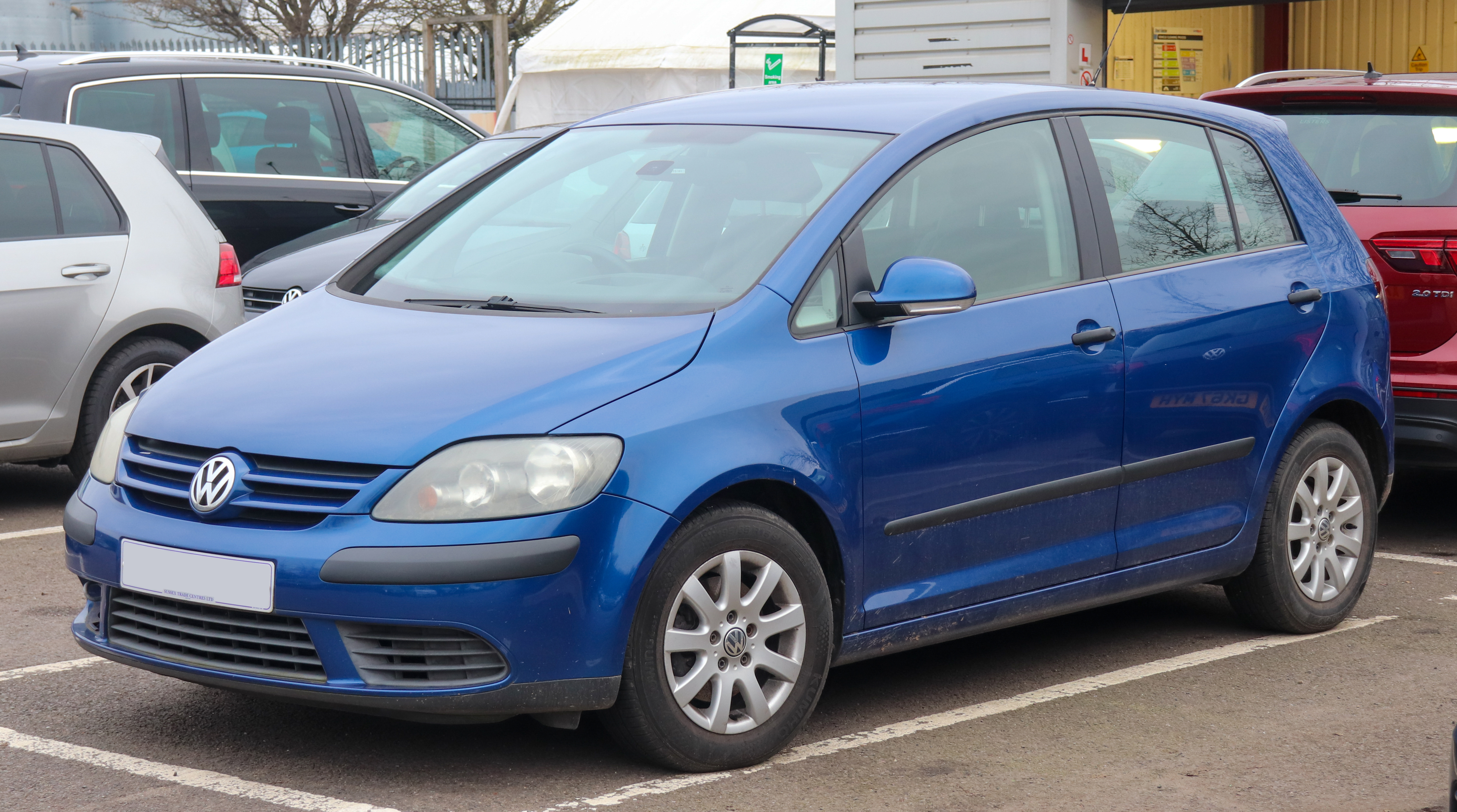
- 2005 Volkswagen Golf Plus SE (pre-facelift)

Overview
- Manufacturer: Volkswagen
- Also called: Volkswagen CrossGolf (crossover-styled variant)
- Production: 2004–2014
- Assembly: Germany: Wolfsburg; Ukraine: Solomonovo (Eurocar)
- Designer: Hartmut Warkuß, Peter Schreyer and Andreas Mindt

Body and chassis
- Body style: 5-door hatchback
- Layout: Front-engine, front-wheel-drive
- Platform: Volkswagen Group A5 (PQ35)
- Related: Volkswagen Golf Mk5; Volkswagen Golf Mk6; Volkswagen Touran Mk1; Volkswagen Jetta (A5); Volkswagen Eos; Škoda Octavia Mk2; SEAT Altea; SEAT León Mk2; SEAT Toledo Mk3; Audi A3 Mk2

Powertrain
- Engine: Petrol: 1.2 L TSI I4; 1.4 L MPI I4; 1.4 L TSI I4; 1.6 L MPI I4; 1.6 L MPI MultiFuel I4; 1.6 L FSI I4; 2.0 L FSI I4; Petrol/LPG: 1.6 L MPI BiFuel I4; Diesel: 1.6 L TDI I4; 1.9 L TDI I4; 2.0 L TDI I4
- Transmission: 5-speed manual; 6-speed manual; 6-speed automatic; 6-speed DSG; 7-speed DSG

Dimensions
- Wheelbase: 2,578 mm (101.5 in)
- Length: 4,204 mm (165.5 in); 4,235 mm (166.7 in) (CrossGolf)
- Width: 1,759 mm (69.3 in); 1,775 mm (69.9 in) (CrossGolf)
- Height: 1,580 mm (62.2 in); 1,650 mm (65.0 in) (CrossGolf)
- Kerb weight: 1,293–1,501 kg (2,851–3,309 lb)

Chronology
- Successor: Volkswagen Golf Sportsvan/SV

The Volkswagen Golf Plus is a car that was manufactured by Volkswagen between 2004 and 2014. It has been variously described as a hatchback, a compact multi-purpose vehicle (MPV), or a combination of the two. It was developed as a taller alternative to the Golf hatchback and positioned below the seven-seater Touran in Volkswagen's MPV category. The car is based on the Golf Mk5, rides on the PQ35 platform, and was accompanied by a crossover-styled variant called the Volkswagen CrossGolf in 2006. Throughout its life cycle, it has been sold alongside the Golf Mk5 and the Golf Mk6 for its final two years.

In 2014, the Golf Plus was replaced by the MQB-based Golf Sportsvan.

== Overview ==
The Golf Plus was presented to the public at the Bologna Motor Show in December 2004. It is 95 mm (3.74 in) taller than the Golf Mk5, and 150 mm (5.91 in) shorter than the three-row Touran. It offers higher seating position, and more space in the cabin with an extra 50 litres (1.8 cu ft) of boot space at 395 litres (13.9 cu ft), which is expandable to 505 litres (17.8 cu ft) by lowering the boot floor. The rear seats can slide by 160 millimetres (6.3 in) and folded in a new system, resulting in an almost level luggage space when folded. It also split 60:40, with the middle seat doubling as a fold-down drink table. The Golf Plus is optionally available with a large roof console, three unfolding storage compartments are located in the front area.

Many parts of the Golf Mk5 were also used in the Golf Plus, such as engines, transmissions, headrests and exterior mirrors. In contrast to the normal Golf, standard LED rear lights were used in the Golf Plus, the first in the C-segment.

It has a drag coefficient of 0.32.

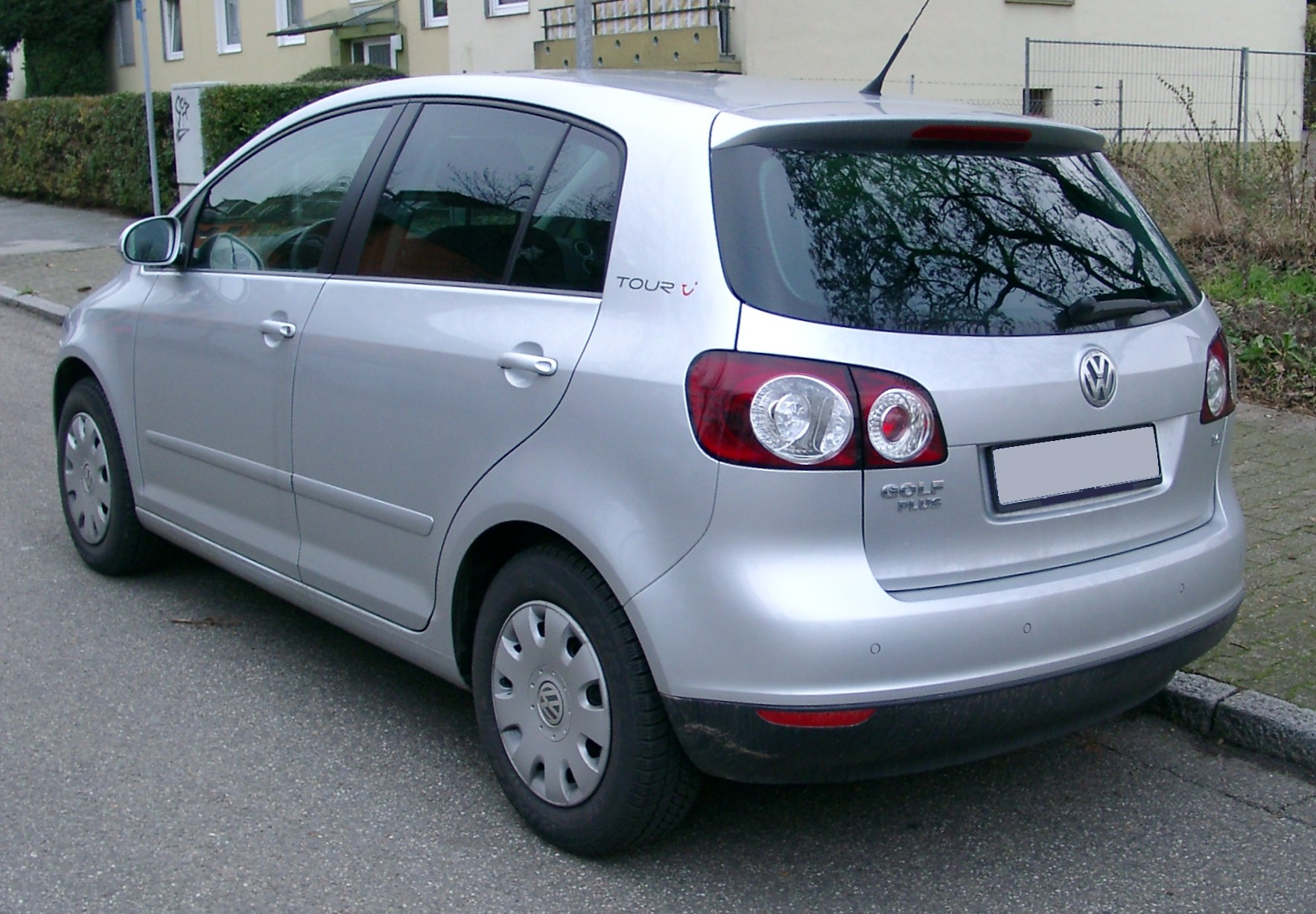
Rear view (pre-facelift)

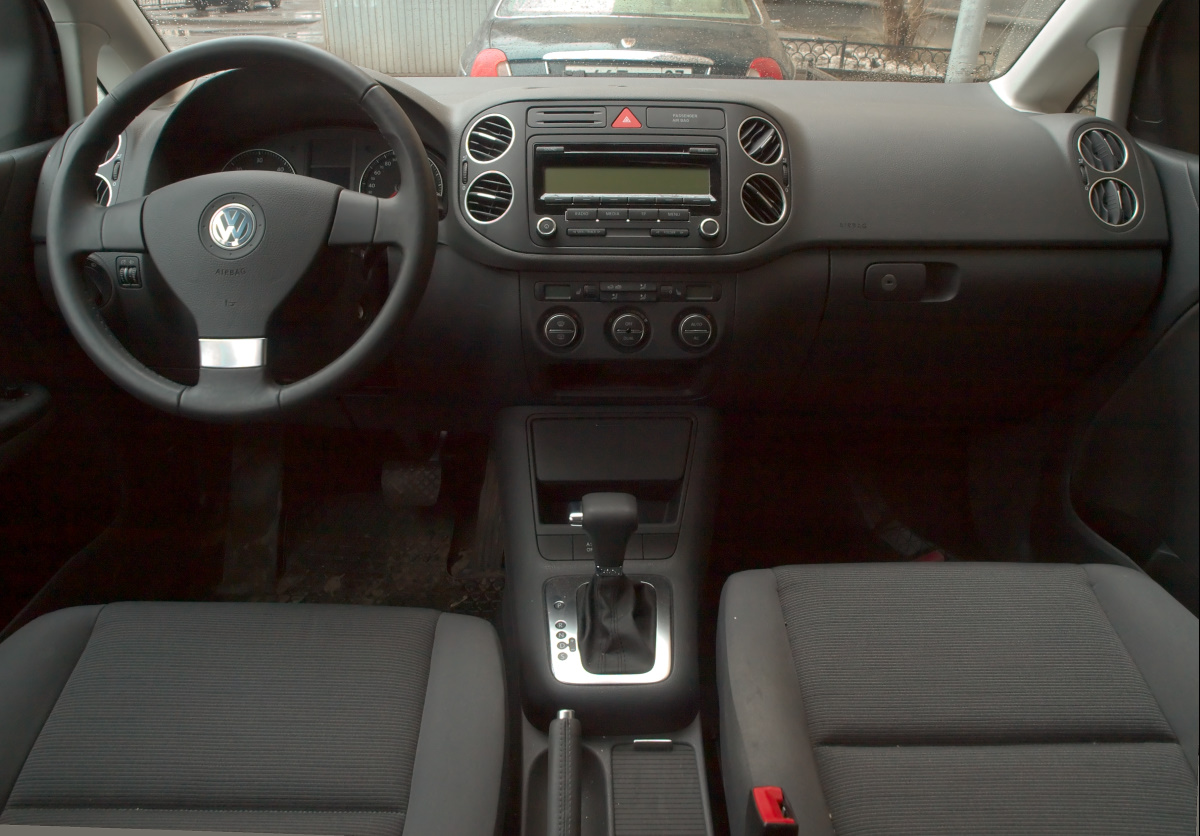
Interior

== Facelift ==
In December 2008, the facelifted version was revealed at the Bologna Motor Show, featuring a revised front end which saw the introduction of the horizontally aligned band front grille and new headlights with daytime running lights, aligning its styling to the Golf Mk6. The revised variant went on sale in early 2009. It retains a largely similar design of the rear end and the interior. For the first time on the Golf Plus, a parallel parking assistance system called ParkAssist was offered. A rear-view camera mounted behind the Volkswagen badge was also available as an option.

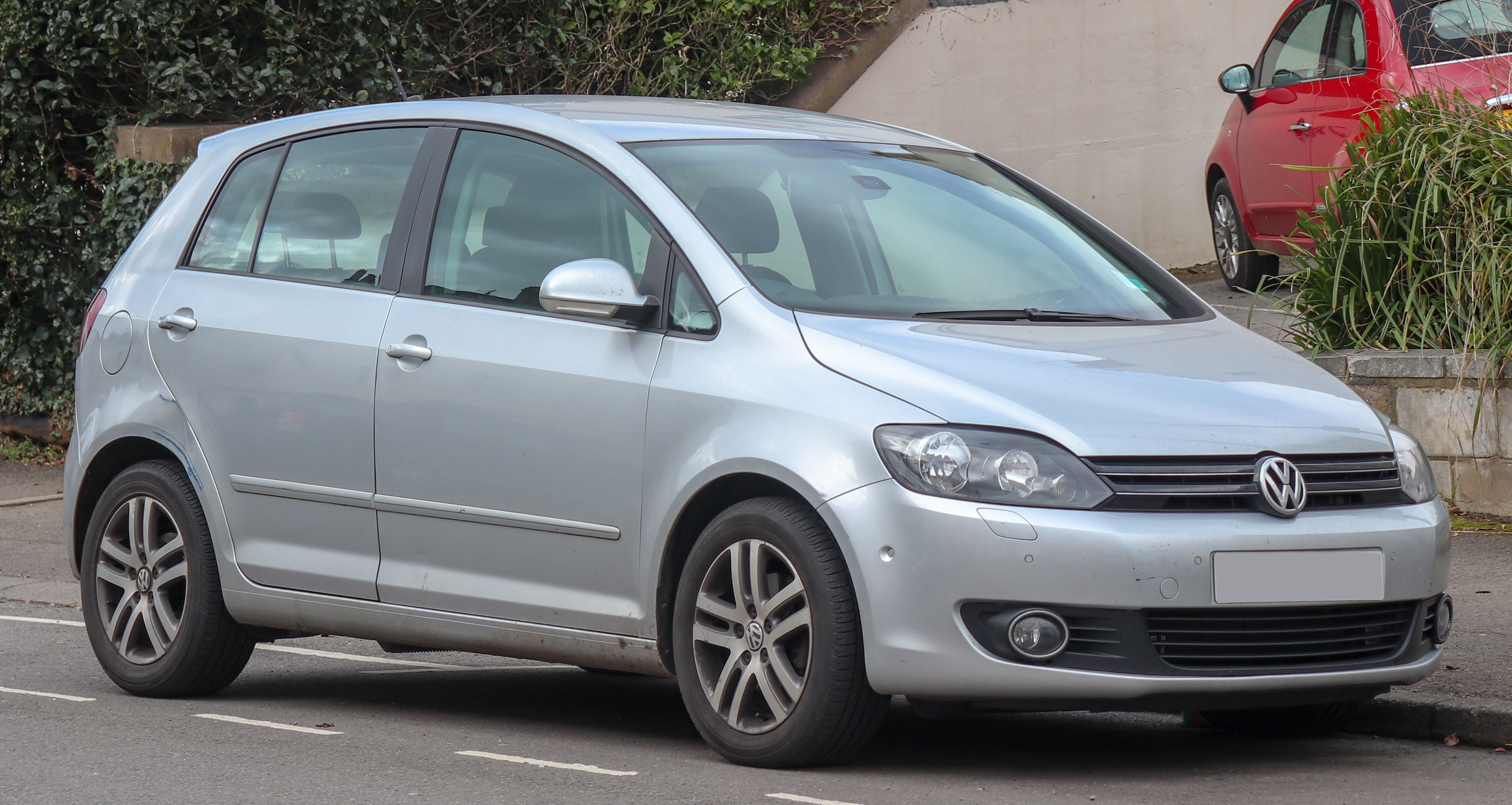
2009 Golf Plus SE (facelift)

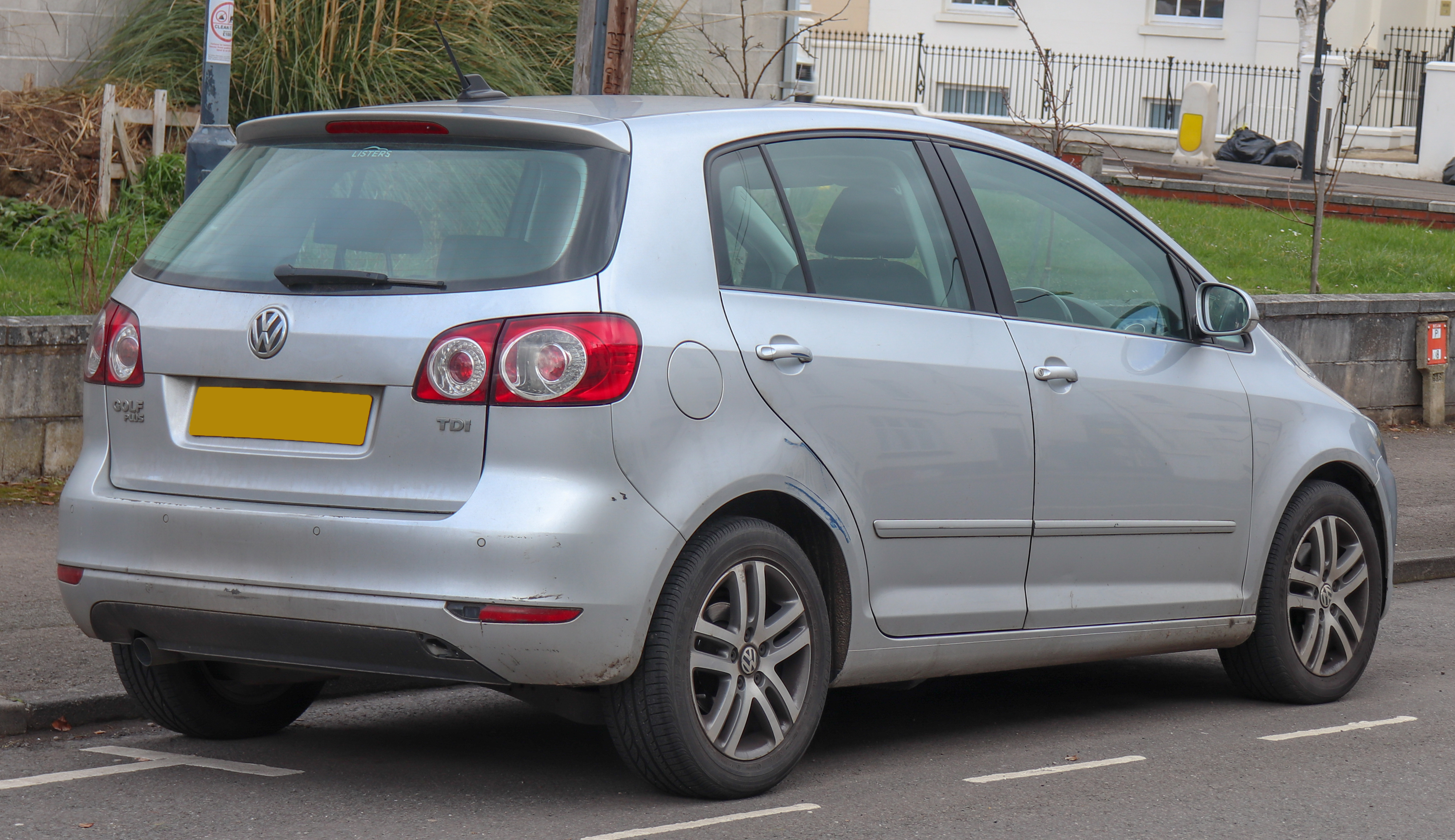
2009 Golf Plus SE (facelift)

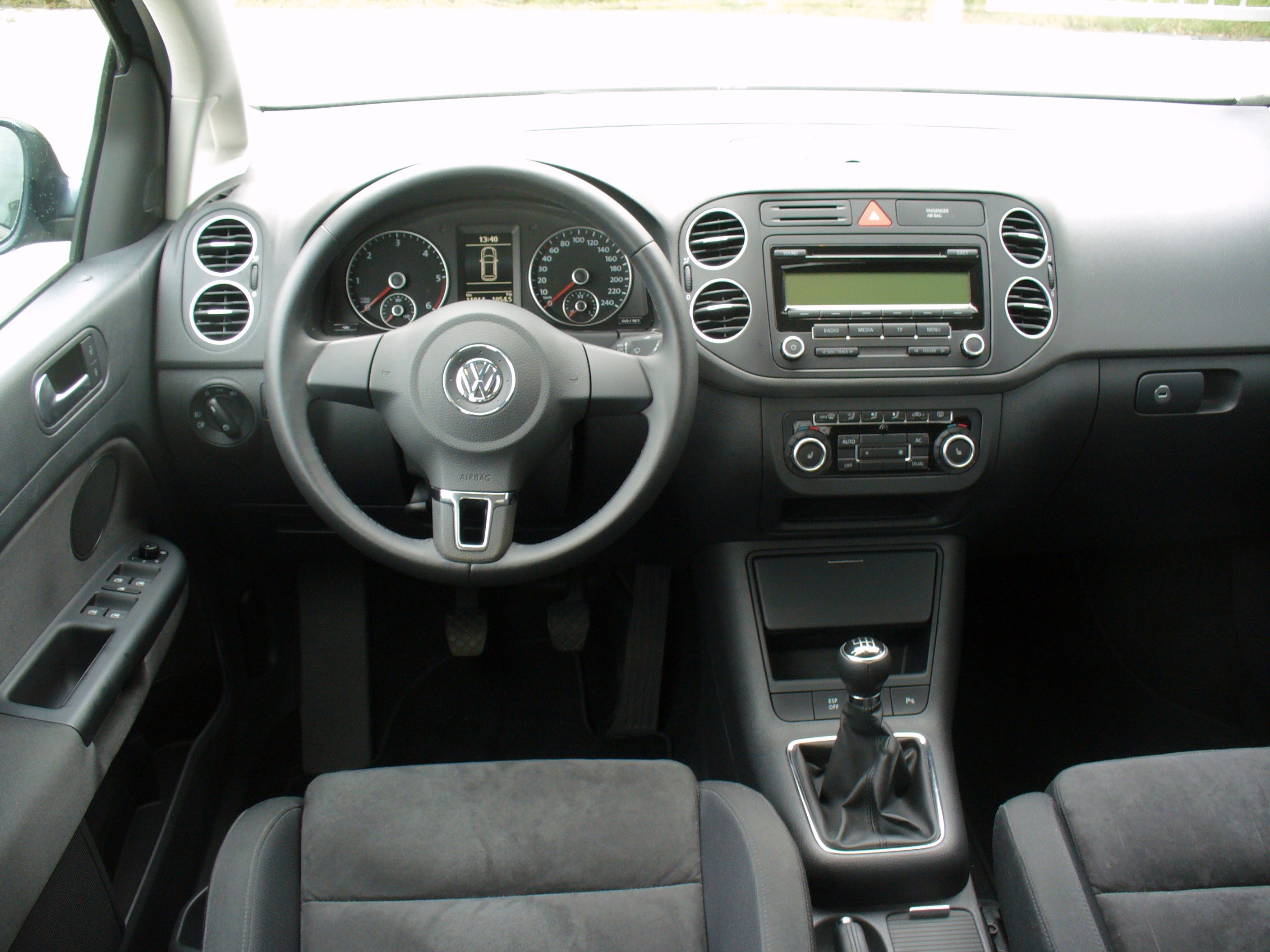
Interior

== CrossGolf ==
At the 2006 Paris Motor Show, Volkswagen released the CrossGolf which is a version of the Golf Plus with black-plastic body cladding and slightly increased ride height. Part of the Volkswagen Cross family which also includes the CrossPolo and CrossTouran, it was developed by the Volkswagen Individual division, which also developed the Golf R32.

The CrossGolf is only available in front-wheel drive configuration, and is powered by two petrol engines, 1.6 and 1.4 TSI, and two diesel engines, 1.9 TDI and 2.0 TDI, with outputs ranging from 102 PS (75 kW; 101 bhp) to 140 PS (103 kW; 138 bhp). In the UK, this model is badged as Golf Plus Dune and sold with the 1.9 TDI outputting 105 PS (77 kW; 104 bhp).

The facelifted model was introduced in February 2010 at the Geneva Motor Show.

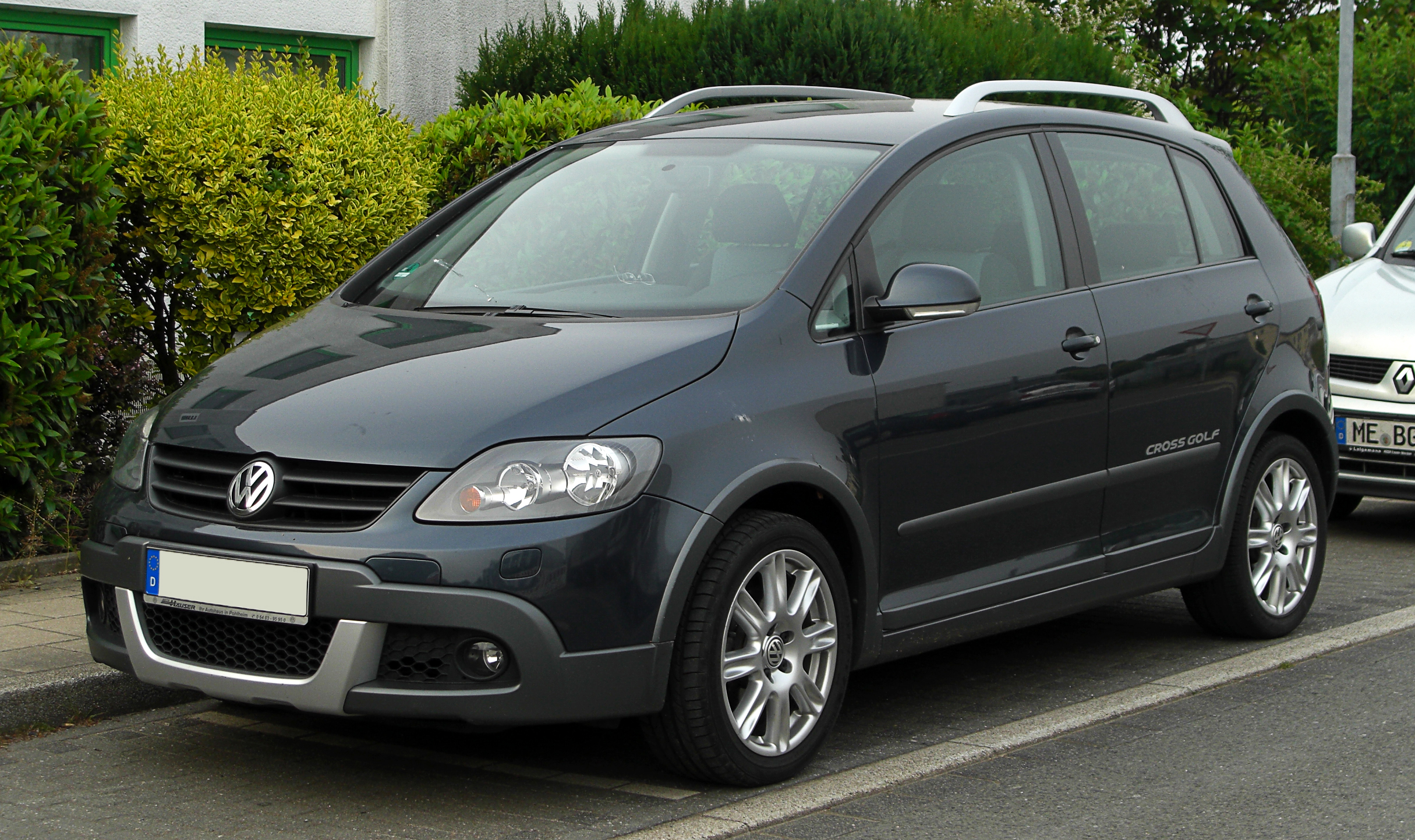
CrossGolf (pre-facelift)

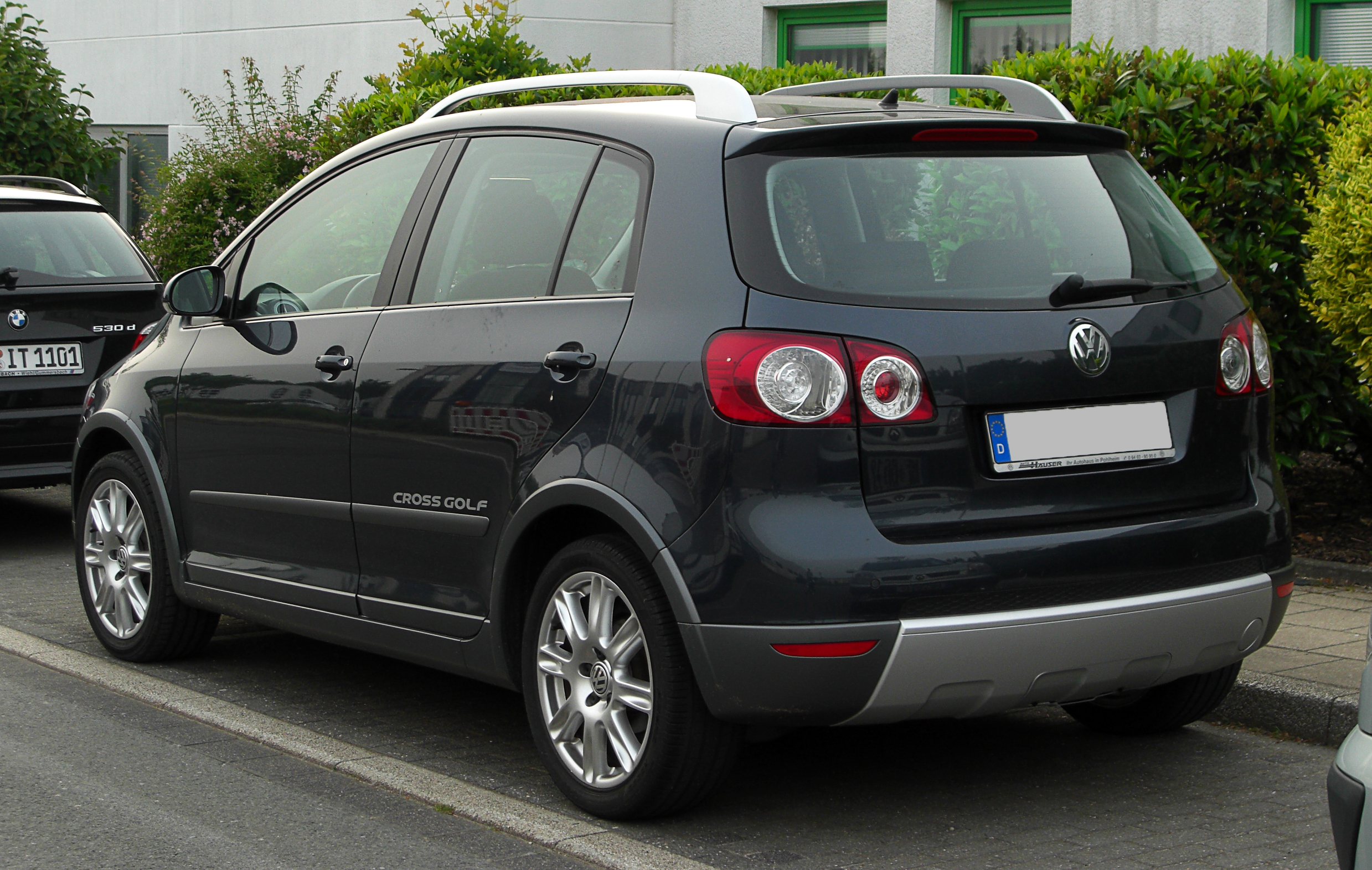
CrossGolf (pre-facelift)

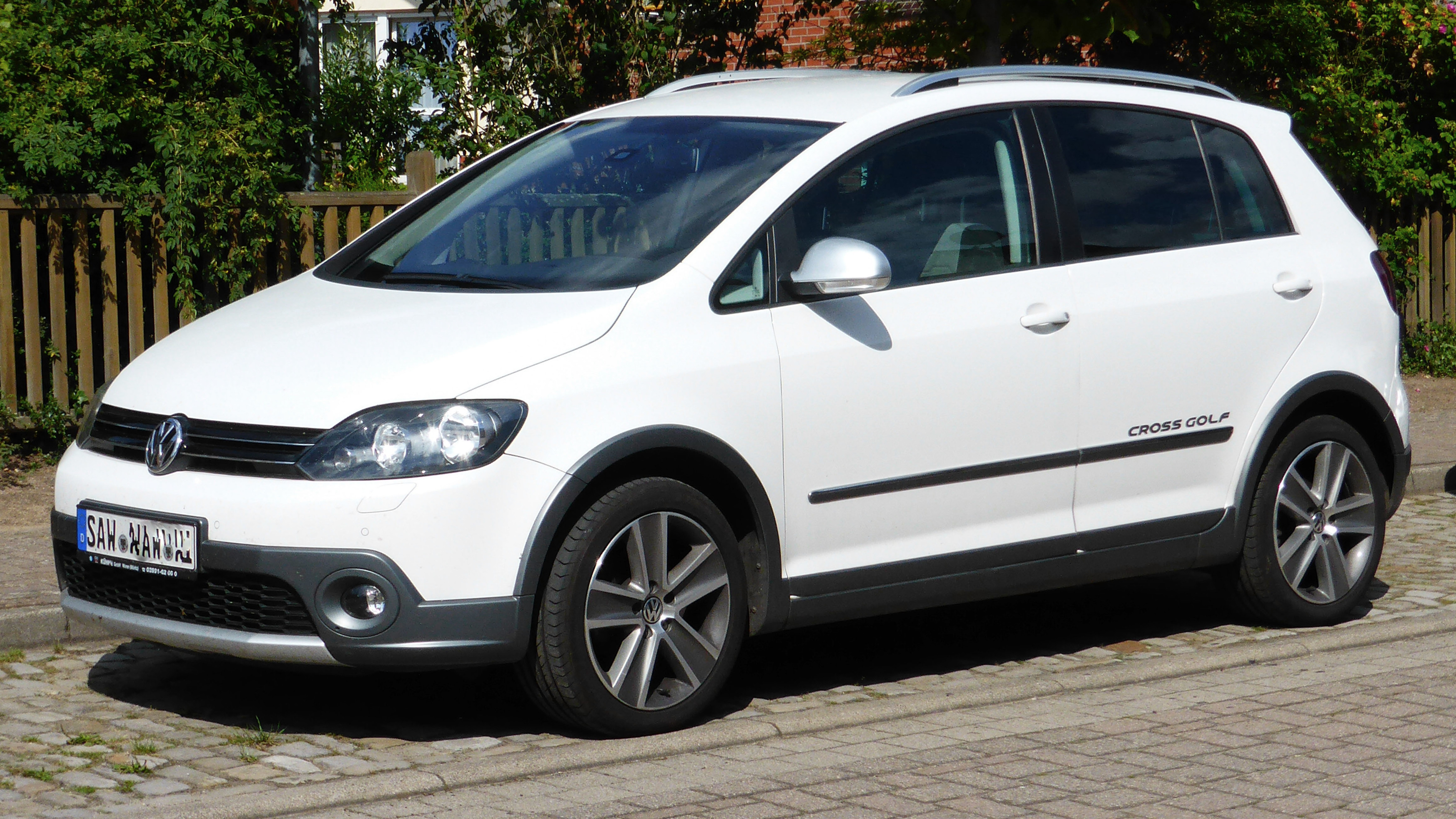
CrossGolf (facelift)

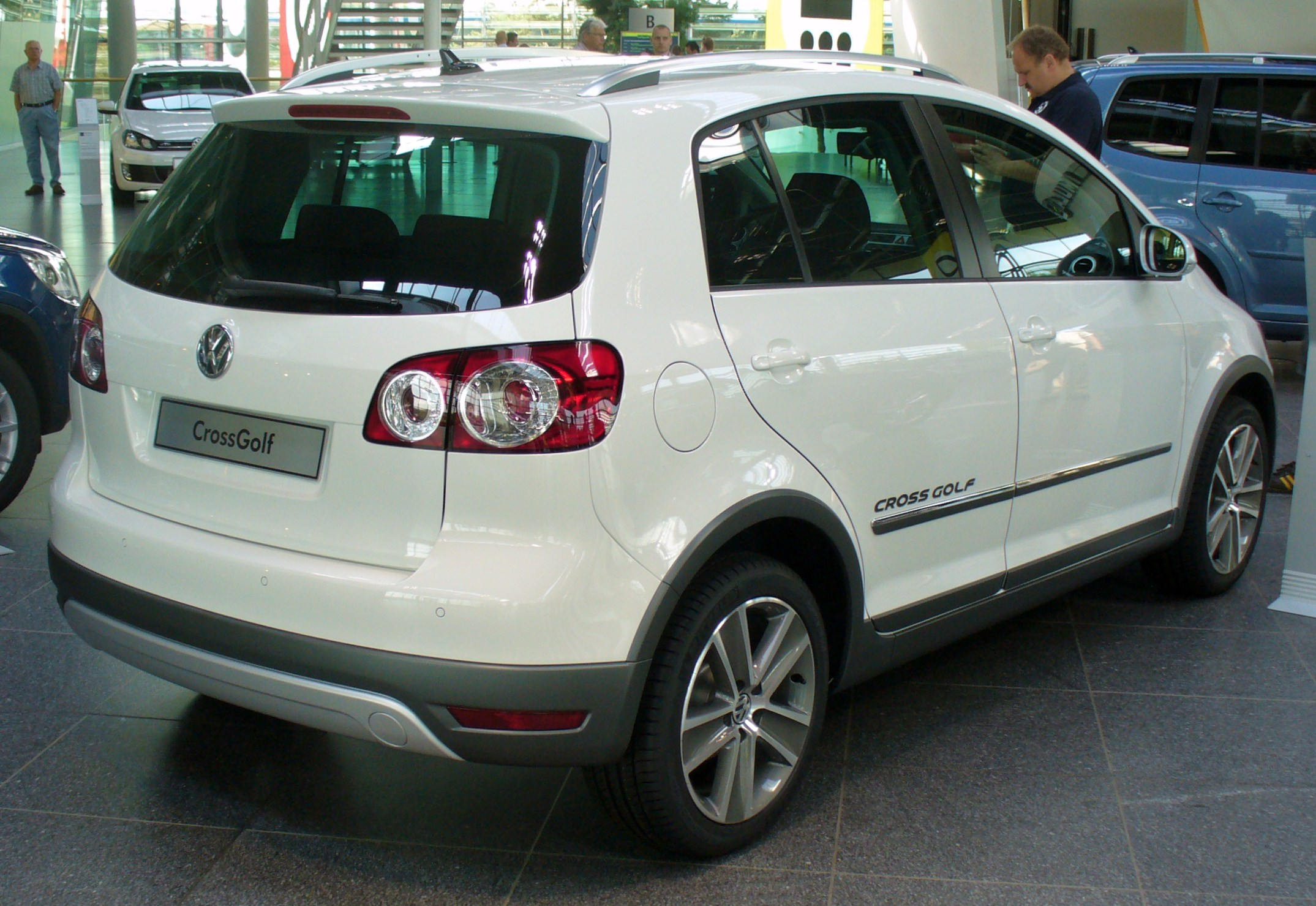
CrossGolf (facelift)

== Powertrain ==
Throughout its production run, seven petrol engine variants are available with an output between 75–170 PS (74–168 hp; 55–125 kW), and five diesel engine variants with an output of 90–140 PS (89–138 hp; 66–103 kW). All diesel engines are equipped with a diesel particulate filter (DPF).

The BlueMotion model was also available with 105 PS (104 hp; 77 kW) and a 5-speed manual gearbox. For efficiency, the BlueMotion model received changes in engine tuning such as lowering the idling RPM. It also received aerodynamic changes such as underbody cover, low-friction tires and lowering the right height by 15 mm (1 in). The third, fourth and fifth gears of the transmission have a longer gear ratio. Average fuel economy was rated at 4.8 L/100 km (21 km/L; 49 mpg_{‑US}).

An LPG variant (BiFuel) was also offered with an output of 98 PS (97 hp; 72 kW) and a 5-speed manual gearbox.

Petrol engines
Model	Displacement	Series	Power	Torque	Years
1.2 TSI	1,197 cc I4	CBZA	86 PS (85 hp; 63 kW)	160 N⋅m (16.3 kg⋅m; 118 lb⋅ft)	2010–2014
1.2 TSI	1,197 cc I4	CBZB	105 PS (104 hp; 77 kW)	175 N⋅m (17.8 kg⋅m; 129 lb⋅ft)	2009–2014
1.4	1,390 cc I4	BCA	75 PS (74 hp; 55 kW)	126 N⋅m (12.8 kg⋅m; 92.9 lb⋅ft)	2004–2006
1.4	1,390 cc I4	BUD/CGGA	80 PS (79 hp; 59 kW)	132 N⋅m (13.5 kg⋅m; 97.4 lb⋅ft)	2006–2014
1.4 TSI	1,390 cc I4	CAXA	122 PS (120 hp; 90 kW)	200 N⋅m (20.4 kg⋅m; 148 lb⋅ft)	2007–2014
1.4 TSI	1,390 cc I4	BMY	140 PS (138 hp; 103 kW)	220 N⋅m (22.4 kg⋅m; 162 lb⋅ft)	2006–2008
1.4 TSI	1,390 cc I4	CAVD	160 PS (158 hp; 118 kW)	240 N⋅m (24.5 kg⋅m; 177 lb⋅ft)	2008–2014
1.4 TSI	1,390 cc I4	BLG	80 PS (79 hp; 59 kW)	132 N⋅m (13.5 kg⋅m; 97.4 lb⋅ft)	2006–2014
1.6	1,595 cc I4	BSE/BSF/CCSA	102 PS (101 hp; 75 kW)	148 N⋅m (15.1 kg⋅m; 109 lb⋅ft)	2005–2010
1.6 MultiFuel	1,595 cc I4	CMXA	102 PS (101 hp; 75 kW)	148 N⋅m (15.1 kg⋅m; 109 lb⋅ft)	2010–2014
1.6 BiFuel	1,595 cc I4	CHGA	98 PS (97 hp; 72 kW) (LPG); 102 PS (101 hp; 75 kW) (petrol)	144 N⋅m (14.7 kg⋅m; 106 lb⋅ft) (LPG); 148 N⋅m (15.1 kg⋅m; 109 lb⋅ft) (petrol)	2010–2014
1.6 FSI	1,598 cc I4	BLF/BLP	115 PS (113 hp; 85 kW)	155 N⋅m (15.8 kg⋅m; 114 lb⋅ft)	2004–2007
2.0 FSI	1,984 cc I4	BLR/BVY	150 PS (148 hp; 110 kW)	200 N⋅m (20.4 kg⋅m; 148 lb⋅ft)	2005–2008
Diesel engines
1.6 TDI (CR)	1,598 cc 14	CAYB	90 PS (89 hp; 66 kW)	230 N⋅m (23.5 kg⋅m; 170 lb⋅ft)	2009–2014
1.6 TDI (CR)	1,598 cc 14	CAYC	105 PS (104 hp; 77 kW)	250 N⋅m (25.5 kg⋅m; 184 lb⋅ft)	2009–2014
1.9 TDI (PD)	1,896 cc I4	BRU/BXF/BXJ	90 PS (89 hp; 66 kW)	210 N⋅m (21.4 kg⋅m; 155 lb⋅ft)	2005–2008
1.9 TDI (PD)	1,896 cc I4	BKC/BXE/BLS	105 PS (104 hp; 77 kW)	250 N⋅m (25.5 kg⋅m; 184 lb⋅ft)	2004–2008
2.0 TDI (CR)	1,968 cc I4	CBDC	110 PS (108 hp; 81 kW)	250 N⋅m (25.5 kg⋅m; 184 lb⋅ft)	2008–2009
2.0 TDI (PD)	1,968 cc I4	BKD	140 PS (138 hp; 103 kW)	320 N⋅m (32.6 kg⋅m; 236 lb⋅ft)	2004–2008
2.0 TDI (PD)	1,968 cc I4	BMM	140 PS (138 hp; 103 kW)	320 N⋅m (32.6 kg⋅m; 236 lb⋅ft)	2005–2008
2.0 TDI (CR)	1,968 cc I4	CBDB	150 PS (148 hp; 110 kW)	320 N⋅m (32.6 kg⋅m; 236 lb⋅ft)	2008–2014

== Sales ==
Year	Europe
2004	14
2005	106,076
2006	128,137
2007	102,453
2008	89,459
2009	106,095
2010	83,838
2011	84,254
2012	68,453
2013	61,712
2014	6,415
2015	16
2016	5

Preceded by –	Volkswagen Golf Plus; 2004–2014	Succeeded by Volkswagen Golf Sportsvan
