= Liquid AI =

American artificial intelligence company

- Type: Private
- Industry: Artificial intelligence
- Founded: March 2023; 3 years ago in Massachusetts, U.S.
- Founder: Ramin Hasani; Mathias Lechner; Alexander Amini; Daniela Rus
- Headquarters: Cambridge, Massachusetts, U.S.
- Key people: Ramin Hasani (CEO); Mathias Lechner (CTO); Alexander Amini (Chief Science Officer); Daniela Rus (co-founder)
- Products: Liquid foundation models
- Website: www.liquid.ai

Liquid AI is an American artificial intelligence company, an MIT spin-off, that develops liquid foundation models running directly on devices without a cloud connection. It was founded in 2023 by Ramin Hasani, Mathias Lechner, and Alexander Amini, together with the MIT computer scientist Daniela Rus.

Unlike the conventional transformer-based neural networks, whose parameters are fixed once training is complete, the company's models can continue to adapt after training and use fewer neurons, so that they need less memory and computing power.

== History ==
Liquid AI's technology originated in research by Ramin Hasani and Mathias Lechner on the nervous system of the roundworm Caenorhabditis elegans, conducted during their computer science PhDs at TU Wien in the laboratory of Radu Grosu. From the worm's nervous system they derived computational principles that they used to build a simple software neural network.

Daniela Rus, a director of the MIT Computer Science and Artificial Intelligence Laboratory (CSAIL), learned of Hasani's work when she was training much larger models to operate self-driving cars. Rus invited Hasani and his colleague to MIT in 2017, where the research was further developed at her laboratory.

Liquid AI was founded in March 2023 by Hasani, who became chief executive; Lechner, who became chief technology officer; and Alexander Amini, who became chief science officer, with Rus serving as a technical adviser and board member.

In December 2023, the company raised $37.5 million in seed funding, led by Stephen Pagliuca and OSS Capital.

In September 2024, Liquid AI publicly released its models and described how its software works for the first time, making the technology available for testing over the internet. It called the models "liquid foundation models" to contrast them with the large language models used by services such as ChatGPT. The initial models included ones for detecting financial fraud, controlling self-driving cars, and analyzing genetic data. Samsung and e-commerce platform Shopify joined the company's models testing.

As of mid-2024, Liquid AI was demonstrating its software to potential investors; some machine-learning researchers considered liquid neural networks better suited to steering drones and self-driving cars than to generating text.

In December 2024, Liquid AI raised $250 million at a valuation of more than $2.3 billion, in a round led by AMD.

In January 2025, Liquid AI announced LFM-7B, a model with 7 billion parameters, which the company said outperformed conventional language models of the same size. The company worked with DARPA to test one of its models in flying an aircraft.

== Technology ==
Liquid AI develops liquid foundation models, artificial intelligence systems based on liquid neural networks that were inspired by the nervous system of the roundworm Caenorhabditis elegans.

The liquid foundation models are small enough and need less computing power to run directly on devices, such as smart glasses or self-driving cars, without a connection to the cloud.

In a conventional transformer-based neural network, the behavior of each simulated neuron is set by a fixed value, or weight, once training is complete. In a liquid neural network, the behavior of each neuron is instead governed by an equation that predicts how it changes over time, and the network solves a series of linked equations as it runs. Because of this design, the networks can continue to adapt after training, changing their parameters in response to new inputs rather than staying fixed.

The neurons in liquid neural networks can influence one another in both directions, which makes the models behave probabilistically, so that the same input may produce slightly different responses. The models are also more open to inspection than conventional ones, because their behavior can be rewound to show how an output was produced.

A drawback of the technology is that liquid neural networks are best suited to time series data, such as video, audio, or sensor readings, and cannot process static images in the way that conventional AI can. Making the technology work with other kinds of data requires custom code.

=== Application ===
In 2020, the company's founders showed that a liquid neural network with only 19 neurons and 253 synapses could control a simulated self-driving car. Early versions were slow, because they had to solve a series of complex equations step by step before producing an output. In 2022, the researchers found a shortcut that approximated these equations without the heavy computation, allowing the models to run far faster while keeping their flexibility. To do so, the researchers had to solve a calculus problem that had remained open since 1907.

A network trained to fly a drone through an outdoor environment can contain 20,000 parameters and fewer than 20 neurons, compared with the billions of parameters in models such as GPT-3. In one experiment reported in 2023, the smallest liquid network tested, with 34 neurons and about 12,000 parameters, was trained to steer a drone toward a target and outperformed a standard network with about 250,000 parameters when the target was moved to unfamiliar surroundings.

In April 2026, Liquid AI announced a partnership with Mercedes-Benz to place its language models in all of its North American vehicles to power advanced speech technology.

The technology has also been explored as a compact on-board "brain" for robots. In Daniela Rus's MIT laboratory, liquid neural networks run directly on soft-bodied and ingestible robots that adapt to changing physical conditions without relying on the cloud. Such robots include prototypes for retrieving swallowed objects from the body and for monitoring sea life and coral reefs.

=== Reception ===
Sébastien Bubeck, a researcher at OpenAI who studies how the architecture and training of AI models affect their capabilities, described the company's SLM benchmark results as "very promising."

Peter Bentley, a computer scientist at University College London who specializes in biologically inspired computing, said the shift to liquid foundation models was crucial because most current AI relies on large, power-hungry models, and that fewer neurons mean smaller models, less computation, and less energy, along with an ability to keep learning that large models struggle with. Kanaka Rajan, a computational neuroscientist at Harvard University, noted the constant adaptation makes the approach computationally intensive and that it will not necessarily use less energy than mainstream AI, but that it represents a significant step toward more realistic AI that more closely mimics the brain.

Mike Davies, who directs the Neuromorphic Computing Lab at Intel, commented that such technology probably will not fully replace regular computers or traditional AI models, and that he expects many types of systems to coexist.

== Business model ==
The company’s business model differs from the traditional approach used by OpenAI and Anthropic, which sell access to their models through subscriptions with usage limits and rely on cloud infrastructure. Liquid AI offers its liquid foundation models free to download, run, and fine-tune, including for commercial use, until a customer reaches $10 million in annual revenue.

Mert Demirer, an associate professor of applied economics at the MIT Sloan School of Management, said that small companies using models from OpenAI or Anthropic may pay large sums for capabilities they do not need, whereas Liquid AI could offer them a more tailored solution. He noted the main downside of this approach is scalability, because a standardized, uniform product served to all customers is far easier to scale than a customized one.
