= IF Product Design Award =

Award

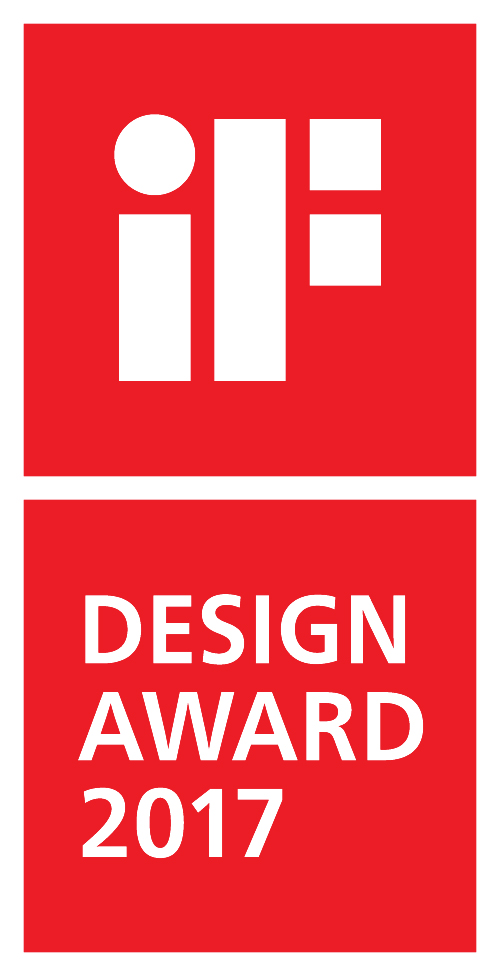
2017 logo

The iF Product Design Award was introduced in 1954 and is annually conferred by the iF International Forum Design. The award, which spans multiple disciplines, has more than 5,500 entries from around 59 nations every year.

== History ==
The iF Industrie Forum Design e.V. launched in 1953 with a "Special Show for Well-Designed Industrial Goods" as part of the Hanover Fair industrial trade exhibition, originally to highlight German Design. They now strive to serve as a mediating arm between design and industry internationally, believing that this capacity allows them to make contributions to design services and to increase public awareness on the importance of design. In 2000-2002 they combined all relevant areas in design, some with previous award programs they had started, to become the iF Design Award. The contest attracts entries from more than 50 countries, in 9 disciplines spanning 82 categories. iF International Forum Design published annual yearbooks showcasing the winners of their design awards.

== Community ==
The iF Industrial Forum Design is joined by other design professionals organizations around the world to increase public awareness about design. Designers who are members of Industrial Designers Society of America (IDSA), Verband Deutscher Industrie Designer e.V. (VDID), and International Council of Societies of Industrial Design (ICSID, now the World Design Organization) are just a few of the international community that enter the iF Product Design competition.

=== iF Design Winners ===
- Iskradata 1680 (1981)
- ASRock M8 (2014)
- CleanMyMac (2020, 2026)
- Samsung Electronics (2021, 2026)
- Waterson Self-Closing Swing Clear Hinge (2023)
- Sony – various products and years, including PlayStation 5 Pro
- THE ANALOG THING, (2024)
- Apple – multiple products, including Mac Pro, Apple Vision Pro Dual Knit Band, Apple Watch of different series, and other products (various years, eg. 2014-2026)
- LG Electronics Home Robot (2026) and other products

== Disciplines and categories ==
- Product (sub-categories include Sub-Categories: Automotive, Sports/outdoor/Bicycles, Leisure, Kids, Jewelry, Audio, TV/Cameras, Telecommunication, Computer, VR/Gaming, Office, Lighting, Home furniture, Kitchen, Household, Bathroom, Garden, Building technology, Retail, Healthcare, Industry, and Textiles)
- Packaging (8 Sub-Categories)
- Communication (9 Sub-Categories)
- Interior Architecture (8 Sub-Categories)
- Professional Concept (10 Sub-Categories)
- Service Design / UX (8 Sub-Categories)
- Architecture (6 Sub-Categories)

== See also ==
- List of design awards
- Red Dot Design Award
- German Design Award
- Industrial Designers Society of America
- Industrial design
