= Kromtech =

Security software organization and IT investment and development company

Kromtech Alliance Corp.
- Industry: Computer software Security software
- Founded: Germany (2013)
- Headquarters: Road Town, Tortola, British Virgin Islands
- Area served: U.S.
- Products: MacKeeper
- Website: http://kromtech.com/

Kromtech Alliance Corp. is a Security software organization and IT investment and development company that develops software and provides customer support services for Apple's Mac OS. Kromtech Alliance Corp previously owned and distributed MacKeeper, Memory Keeper, and the anti-theft application Track My Mac.

== Products ==
=== MacKeeper ===
MacKeeper is a software and a service for macOS to protect Mac users from malware, online threats, and identity theft along with Mac performance optimization. Kromtech Alliance Corp. purchased MacKeeper from the developer ZeoBit in April, 2013. Under Zeobit a class action lawsuit was filed against MacKeeper because the company allegedly deceived users into paying for unneeded fixes. The lawsuit was settled in 2015 for US$2 million with no admission of wrongdoing. In 2018, the company started taking steps to eliminate affiliates, engaged in aggressive sales techniques to promote the sale of the software. In 2019, the company announced the major transformation led by the new international executive team members. At the end of 2019, product and service of MacKeeper received AppEsteem Certification.

=== MemoryKeeper ===
MemoryKeeper is an app for controlling the memory usage on a Mac computer. It frees up Random-access memory or RAM and has automatic cleanup setting that gives priority. Kromtech Alliance Corp. released MemoryKeeper in November 2014 and it has been well received on Apple's iTunes.

=== Track My Mac ===
Track My Mac is an anti-theft application launched in February 2016. It allows users to lock and unlock a lost or stolen computer remotely and to photograph whoever is using the lost or stolen computer.

== Partnerships ==
=== Partnership with Avira ===
In June 2014, Avira licensed its antivirus technology to Kromtech Alliance Corp. The licensing agreement allows Kromtech to use Avira's Secure Antivirus API (SAVAPI), the official interface for Avira's anti-malware scanning engine. Avira's anti-malware scanning technology runs as a service in the background, accepting the scan requests from MacKeeper.

=== Kromtech and Chris Vickery ===
In December 2015, security researcher Chris Vickery discovered a misconfigured database of 13 million encrypted Kromtech accounts. In January 2016, Kromtech Alliance Corp and Chris Vickery announced a partnership to establish a security research center.

== History ==
In October 2017, Kromtech discovered a leak of the health data of 150,000 patients.

=== Acquired by Clario Tech Limited ===
At the end of 2019, certain assets of Kromtech were acquired by London-based digital security and internet privacy company Clario Tech Limited, who showcased their consumer digital security software at the 2020 Consumer Electronics Show.
