= Setapp =

Subscription-based service for macOS and iOS applications

- Developer: MacPaw Way Ltd.
- Stable release: Setapp (v3.36.1) / 7 March 2024; 2 years ago
- Operating system: OS X 11 or higher
- Platform: macOS, iOS, web
- Available in: English, French, German, Italian, Portuguese and Spanish
- License: Trialware, Software as a service
- Website: setapp.com

Setapp is a subscription-based software catalog launched in 2016 by MacPaw that offers monthly access to a collection of macOS and iOS applications. The service aims to provide software developers with an alternative method for macOS software distribution and monetization that does not rely on Apple's App Store. Setapp additionally offers premium access to select iOS apps in its catalog. In 2024, Setapp released an official iOS marketplace app available to download in the European Union.

In January 2026, MacPaw announced that it would be sunsetting Setapp Mobile, the company's alternative app store for iOS users in the EU, on 16 February 2026 due to evolving and complex business terms that no longer aligned with Setapp’s business model.

== History ==
Setapp launched in beta in November 2016, and was officially released in January 2017. In June 2017, Setapp reported having 10,000 subscribers worldwide, mainly in the United States but with growing audiences in the United Kingdom, Germany, and France. By November of that year, there were more than 200,000 trial users testing the service. In 2019, the app had 1 million users.

In November 2019, Setapp launched Setapp for Teams, a service adjusted for teams' and organizations' use. Setapp launched an iOS version in August 2020. Notably, apps available through Setapp for iOS must be downloaded from the App Store but can be unlocked to access premium features without using Apple's IAP system.

In July 2023, Setapp introduced an AI-tier plan which offers additional access to credits that can be used within select software available on Setapp.

In August 2023, in response to the Digital Markets Act regulation, Setapp announced its plans to launch an alternative app store for EU users. On 14 May 2024, Setapp released an official marketplace app for iOS that allows users to download iOS applications from the catalog without using the App Store as an intermediary. As of mid-2025, Setapp offers access to over 260 Mac and iOS apps, including popular titles such as CleanMyMac X, Spark, Ulysses, and MarsEdit.

In May 2024, MacPaw launched a closed beta of Setapp Mobile—a curated app marketplace for iOS—available exclusively to users in the European Union. The launch followed regulatory changes under the Digital Markets Act, allowing alternative app distribution on iPhones. The service became publicly available in September 2024, offering over 50 mobile apps at a monthly subscription price of €9.49.

In May 2025, Setapp introduced Eney, a system-integrated AI assistant designed to act as a "computerbeing" capable of executing tasks like file conversions, system cleanup, and folder organization directly on macOS. Initially released in public beta, Eney represents Setapp's deeper focus on artificial intelligence and automation.

A 2024 user survey and independent reviews highlighted Setapp's increasing integration of AI-powered apps and features. Analysts noted that many of the top-performing apps in the platform's catalog incorporate machine learning, and that Setapp itself began implementing smart recommendations and usage tracking to refine user experience.

In early 2026 mother entity MacPaw announce that they closing the app on 16 February 2026.

== Business model ==
Setapp is based on a subscription revenue sharing model that distributes money to developers based on user activity akin to streaming services like Spotify and Netflix. All users are charged a monthly fee that varies depending on region and the selected plan. Instead of paying for each standalone application, users can use all the apps in the collection for the duration of the subscription.

The philosophy behind the initiative was to give users relevant, ready-to-use software that are designed for both generic and specialized tasks. Applications on Setapp are automatically updated and contain no in-app purchases or advertisements.

== Features ==
Setapp provides features designed to optimize workflow and increase productivity. Its AI Search function uses a synonym dictionary, allowing users to find relevant tools. The AI Assistant uses ChatGPT, Open AI, and Setapp's pre-trained model to deliver app search recommendations, tutorials, and Mac-related answers in a separate window. The platform simplifies app downloads and installations. Since many Setapp apps require user accounts, the platform automatically logs users in and activates premium features.

On plans that include iOS device access, Setapp directs users to install the requested application from the App Store. After installing the application, the user can scan a QR code or access a link that will unlock premium features for the app. This access will remain as long as the subscription is active. In the EU, Setapp has released a marketplace application that let's users download these applications directly to their device instead of being directed to the App Store.

== Review process ==
Setapp curates its app collection, focusing on user benefits and utility. It rejects apps with paid components, in-app purchases, advertising, incorrect device or app information, defamatory, offensive or pornographic content. All apps, including updates, undergo a review process for quality, functionality, and privacy. Apps requiring users to download other apps or violating privacy and data protection norms are also prohibited.

== Awards and recognition ==
- Finalist at the 21st annual Interactive Innovation Awards in the New Economy category
- Awarded "Consumer Product of the Year" by Product Hunt at the 2017 Golden Kitty Awards
- Named by Fast Company as one of the top 10 most innovative companies in Europe in 2019
- Awarded "Best SaaS Product for Productivity" by SaaS Awards in 2019
- Awarded Bronze Cannes Lions in the video advertising category for ‘Snake,’ created together with the Droga5 agency in 2021.

== See also ==
- Subscription business model
- Software repository
- App store optimization
- List of mobile app distribution platforms
