= DARPA Grand Challenge (2005) =

Second driverless car competition of the DARPA Grand Challenge

The second driverless car competition of the DARPA Grand Challenge was a 212 km (132 mi) off-road course that began at 6:40 am on October 8, 2005, near the California/Nevada state line. All but one of the 23 finalists in the 2005 race surpassed the 11.78 km (7.32 mi) distance completed by the best vehicle in the 2004 race. Five vehicles successfully completed the course:

Vehicle	Team name	Team home	Time taken (h:m)	Result
Stanley	Stanford Racing Team	Stanford University, Palo Alto, California	6:54	First place
Sandstorm	Red Team	Carnegie Mellon University, Pittsburgh, Pennsylvania	7:05	Second place
H1ghlander	Red Team Too	Carnegie Mellon University, Pittsburgh, Pennsylvania	7:14	Third place
Kat-5	Team Gray	The Gray Insurance Company, Metairie, Louisiana	7:30	Fourth place
TerraMax	Team TerraMax	Oshkosh Truck Corporation, Oshkosh, Wisconsin	12:51	Over 10-hour limit, fifth place

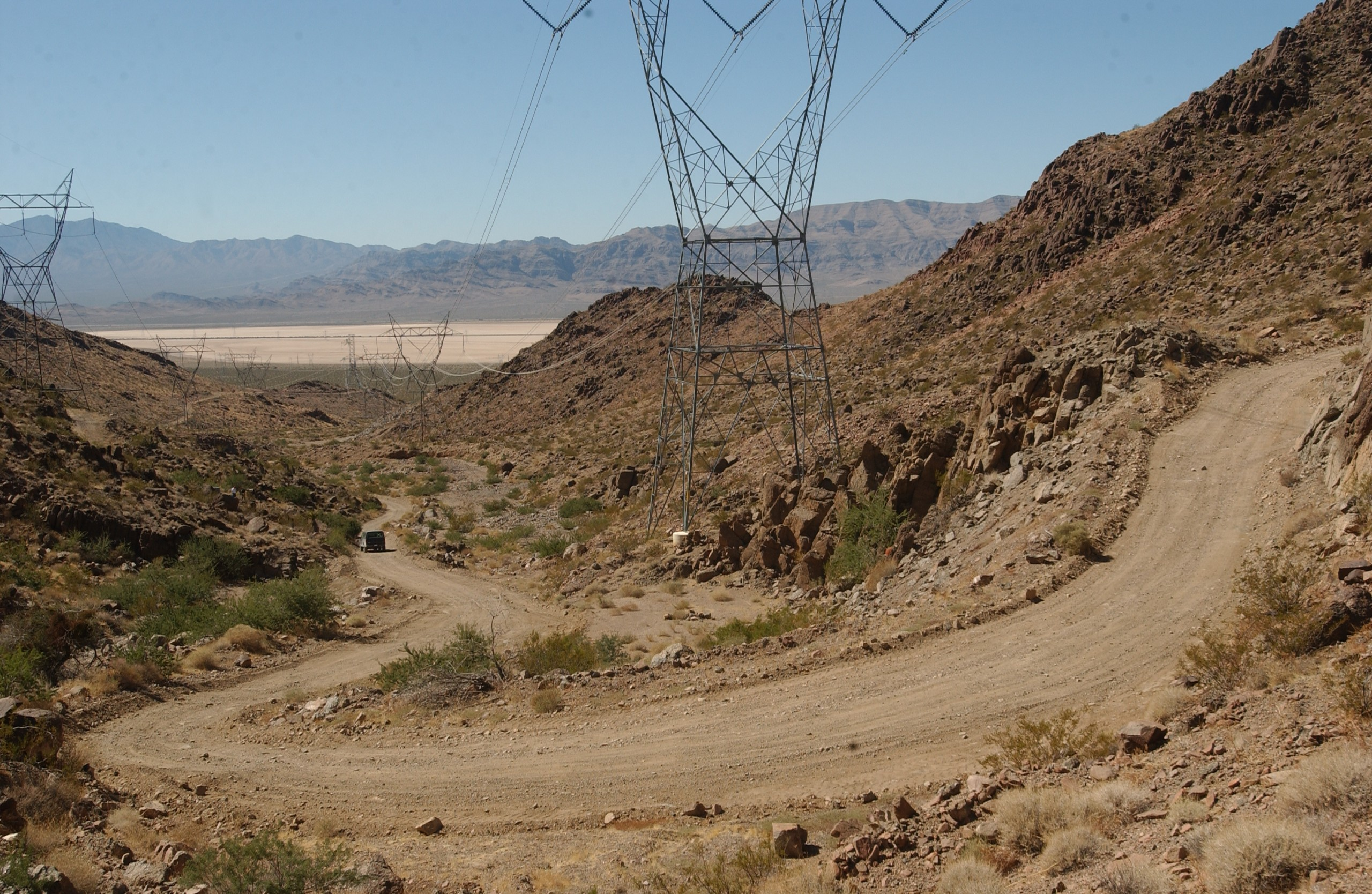
Beer Bottle Pass

Vehicles in the 2005 race passed through three narrow tunnels and navigated more than 100 sharp left and right turns. The race concluded through Beer Bottle Pass, a winding mountain pass with sheer drop-offs on both sides. Although the 2004 course had required more elevation gain, and some very sharp switchbacks (Daggett Ridge) had been required near the beginning of the route, it had had far fewer curves and generally wider roads than the 2005 course.

The natural rivalry between the teams from Stanford and Carnegie Mellon (Sebastian Thrun, head of the Stanford team was previously a faculty member at Carnegie Mellon and colleague of Red Whittaker, head of the CMU team) was played out during the race. Mechanical problems plagued H1ghlander before it was passed by Stanley. Gray Team's entry was a miracle in itself, as the team from the suburbs of New Orleans was caught in Hurricane Katrina several months before the race. The fifth finisher, Terramax, a 30,000-pound entry from Oshkosh Truck, finished on the second day. The huge truck spent the night idling on the course and was particularly nimble in carefully picking its way down the narrow roads of Beer Bottle Pass.

== National Qualification Event (NQE) ==
Of the original 195 applicants, initially 40 teams were selected to participate in the National Qualification Event (NQE). Three teams were added on Aug. 23, 2005 to the semi-finalist 40 teams who were selected from site visits, sending 43 teams to the NQE.

The National Qualification Event was held at California Speedway in Fontana from September 27 through October 5. The results of the NQE were used to cut the 43 teams down to 23 for the race on October 8.

Vehicle performances at the NQE were judged by (1) elapsed time to complete the course; (2) number of obstacles successfully passed without contact; (3) number of gates successfully passed. DARPA did not reveal the relative importance of these three factors. DARPA's final ranking of the vehicles, for purposes of pole position in the Grand Challenge Event (GCE), may have been partly subjective.

The results of the 2005 DARPA NQEs are shown below sorted top to bottom by runs completed and gates passed, compiled from DARPA's published NQE results. This ordering does not correspond to DARPA's ranking of team performance. (For example, this ordering does not reflect speed as an element of performance.) Teams highlighted in green were the teams that DARPA selected to participate in the Grand Challenge desert race.

Team Name	Robot Name	Run 1			Run 2			Run 3			Run 4			Finishes	Total gates	Desert race participant
Team Name	Robot Name	Time	Gates	Obstacles	Time	Gates	Obstacles	Time	Gates	Obstacles	Time	Gates	Obstacles	Finishes	Total gates	Desert race participant
Stanford	Stanley	10	50	4	9	50	4	11	50	5	11	50	5	4	200	Yes
Red Team Too	H1ghlander	10	47	3	9	50	4	10	50	4	10	50	5	4	197	Yes
Red Team	Sandstorm	9	47	4	10	48	5	11	49	5	9	50	4	4	194	Yes
TerraMax	TerraMax	27	47	3	22	47	4	21	49	4	25	50	3	4	193	Yes
Axion Racing	Spirit	15	36	5	16	40	4	12	40	2	12	41	3	4	157	Yes
IVST	Desert Tortoise	x	44	2	11	44	3	8	47	4	11	49	4	3	184	Yes
Sciautionics		x	22	1	16	46	4	14	48	4	14	48	5	3	164	Yes
Buckeyes		x	10	0	21	49	4	16	49	4	25	50	4	3	158	Yes
Caltech	Alice	x	21	0	16	44	5	12	44	4	16	49	5	3	158	Yes
Cornell	Spider	x	9	0	10	49	4	12	50	4	12	50	5	3	158	Yes
VA Tech Rocky	Rocky	x	9	0	13	48	4	15	49	5	15	49	5	3	155	Yes
Mojavaton	Xboxx	x	20	1	x	30	1	15	47	2	16	48	2	2	145	Yes
ENSCO	DEXTER	x	19	0	x	21	0	13	44	4	15	50	4	2	134	Yes
CIMAR	NaviGATOR	x	9	0	x	30	1	15	46	4	13	47	3	2	132	Yes
The Golem Group	Golem 2	x	0	0	x	31	1	9	49	4	12	50	5	2	130	Yes
Insight Racing	Desert Rat	x	12	0	x	17	0	29	47	4	17	49	5	2	125	Yes
DAD	DAD	x	10	0	x	24	0	10	42	4	11	44	4	2	120	Yes
MonsterMoto	JackBot	x	0	0	x	12	0	14	47	5	13	49	5	2	108	Yes
Princeton	Prospect Eleven	x	0	0	x	9	0	13	48	4	12	50	5	2	107	Yes
Jefferson	Tommy	x	10	0	x	16	0	x	36	1	18	49	5	1	111	No
CajunBot	CajunBot	x	0	0	x	18	0	x	29	1	16	49	4	1	96	Yes
Austin		x	5	0	x	21	0	x	22	0	52	45	4	1	93	No
Grey Team	Kat-5	x	2	0	x	14	0	x	15	0	16	48	5	1	79	Yes
UCF	Knight Rider	x	6	0	x	8	0	x	17	0	28	47	5	1	78	No
Va Tech GC Team	Cliff	x	0	0	x	5	0	x	16	0	17	44	3	1	65	Yes
Banzai		x	0	0	x	6	0	x	16	1	21	39	3	1	61	No
Mitre	Meteor	x	0	0	x	0	0	x	10	0	21	44	5	1	54	Yes
AION	AION	x	1	0	x	3	0	x	8	0	35	33	3	1	45	No
Juggernaut	Desert Juggernaut	x	8	0	x	15	0	x	17	0	x	36	1	0	76	No
AI Motovators		x	8	0	x	14	0	x	16	0	x	33	2	0	71	No
Blue Team	Ghost Rider	x	6	0	x	13	0	x	16	1	x	20	1	0	55	No
Indy Robot Racing	IRV	x	6	0	x	12	1	x	14	0	x	23	0	0	55	No
Tormenta	The Black Pearl	x	4	0	x	10	0	x	15	0	x	20	0	0	49	No
CyberRider		x	0	0	x	0	0	x	1	0	x	36	2	0	37	No
Overbot	Overbot	x	4	0	x	6	0	x	10	0	x	11	0	0	31	No
Terra Engineering	TerraHawk	x	0	0	x	6	0	x	7	0	x	14	0	0	27	No
AVS	Flying Fox	x	0	0	x	3	0	x	7	0	x	16	0	0	26	No
Autonosys		x	0	0	x	0	0	x	9	0	x	14	0	0	23	No
BJB Engineering	Quadrivium	x	0	0	x	0	0	x	2	0	x	13	0	0	15	No
PVHS	Road Warriors	x	0	0	x	0	0	x	0	0	x	3	0	0	3	No
Indiana Robotic Nav	Spirit of Christianity	x	0	0	x	0	0	x	0	0	x	2	0	0	2	No
Oregon WAVE	Oregon WAVE Runner	x	0	0	x	0	0	x	0	0	x	0	0	0	0	No
Underdawg		x	0	0	x	0	0	x	0	0	x	0	0	0	0	No

There were four NQE runs. The above four major columns are sorted from worst to best runs of each team. "Time" signifies the time in minutes for a completed run and "x" indicates an incomplete run. "Gates" indicates the number of gates along the track that were passed (there were 50 total per run). "Obstacles" indicates the number of obstacles on the track that were passed (there were 5 total per run). "Finishes" indicates the total number of runs that the team successfully completed (there were 4 runs total). "Total Gates" indicates the total number of gates that the team successfully passed. The teams are sorted from top to bottom according to runs completed and then by total gates passed. Teams indicated as a "desert race participant" are those teams invited by DARPA to participate in the Grand Challenge desert race. Source data

For the first and second run, only 4 obstacles were present whereas for the third and fourth runs 5 obstacles were present. The NQE results presented in the table above show each team's runs sorted left to right from their worst run to their best run in order to better illustrate relative ranking (i.e. not in order of the actual run sequence). The ranking of who was accepted into the Grand Challenge desert race seems to be driven by number of gates passed. Beyond that, it is not known what criteria DARPA used to qualify the participants as acceptance was seemingly driven by decision of the Chief Judge.

On October 6, the selected teams transported their robots to the starting location. On October 7 the teams had a day to fix any portions of the robots broken in the course of transportation prior to the actual race.

== Race ==
A Google Talk video about the DARPA 2005 race is available at YouTube

The route to be followed by the robots was supplied to the teams two hours before the start as a computer file with GPS coordinates, one every 72 m (236 ft) of the route, with more frequent waypoints in difficult patches. Some teams used topographic maps and aerial imagery to manually map out and program precise path and speed settings. Once the race had started, the robots were not allowed to contact humans in any way.

Each robot started at a different time and was "paused" for different amounts of time during the race; DARPA compensated for the staggered start times and subtracted the pause time from each robot's total to derive its final official time. The $2 million prize was awarded on Sunday, October 9, 2005.

The 2005 competitors were much more successful than those of 2004; only one failed to pass the 11.84 km (7.36 mi) mark set by the best-performing 2004 entry, Sandstorm. By the end, 18 robots had been disabled and five robots finished the course. On the first day, Stanley from Stanford University, and H1ghlander and Sandstorm from Carnegie Mellon University, finished within minutes of each other, with Stanley crossing the finish line first. Kat-5 from Gray Team started much later, but finished in a comparable time. The race paused overnight with one competitor, TerraMax, left on the course at mile 83; TerraMax had the stage to itself on Sunday as it belatedly rumbled home.

The winner of the 2005 DARPA Grand Challenge was Stanley, with a course time of 6 hours 53 minutes and 8 seconds (6:53:08) with average speed of 30.7 km/h (19.1 mph). CMU's Sandstorm followed with 7:04:50 at 29.9 km/h (18.6 mph) and H1ghlander at 7:14:00 at 29.3 km/h (18.2 mph). Gray Team's Kat-5 came through at 7:30:16 with average speed of 28.2 km/h (17.5 mph). Oshkosh Truck's Terramax finished at 12:51 and would not have been eligible for the prize because it exceeded the ten-hour limit.

The Official Website (requires Flash player plugin) contained a map and positions of the competitors, while TG Daily posted a running summary of the day's events.

== Race participants ==
#	Vehicle	Team name	Team home	Time taken (h:m)	Result
1.	Stanley	Stanford Racing Team	Stanford University, Palo Alto, California	6:54	First place
2.	Sandstorm	Red Team	Carnegie Mellon University, Pittsburgh, Pennsylvania	7:05	Second place
3.	H1ghlander	Red Team Too	Carnegie Mellon University, Pittsburgh, Pennsylvania	7:14	Third place
4.	Kat-5	Team Gray	The Gray Insurance Company, Metairie, Louisiana	7:30	Fourth place
5.	TerraMax	Team TerraMax	Oshkosh Truck Corporation, Oshkosh, Wisconsin	12:51	Over 10-hour limit, fifth place
6.	DEXTER	Team ENSCO	ENSCO, Springfield, Virginia	DNF	Out of race at 81 miles; tire blowout after going off-course due to bent frame
7.	Spirit	Axion Racing	Westlake Village, California	DNF	Out of race at 66 miles; got stuck in sand, possibly after mechanical failure in suspension
8.	Cliff	Virginia Tech Grand Challenge Team	Virginia Tech, Blacksburg, Virginia	DNF	Out of race at 44 miles due to vehicle motor mechanical problems.
9.	Rocky	Virginia Tech Team Rocky	Virginia Tech, Blacksburg, Virginia	DNF	Out of race at 39 miles; a steep hill caused the oil in its generator to slosh around. The generator's low-oil sensor went off, cutting power to computers.
10.	ION	Desert Buckeyes	Ohio State University, Columbus, Ohio	DNF	Out of race at 29 miles
11.	DAD	Team DAD	Digital Auto Drive/Velodyne Acoustics, Morgan Hill, California	DNF	Out of race at 26 miles; LIDAR scanner failed, loose wire due to vibration.
12.	Desert Rat	Insight Racing	North Carolina State University, Raleigh, North Carolina	DNF	Out of race at 26 miles
13.	Xboxx	Mojavaton	Grand Junction, Colorado	DNF	Out of race at 23.5 miles
14.	Golem 2	The Golem Group/UCLA	Los Angeles, California	DNF	Out of race at 22 miles; software bug crashed main computer causing 60 mph rampage
15.	CajunBot	Team Cajunbot	University of Louisiana, Lafayette, Louisiana	DNF	Out of race at 17 miles; The motor on the brake actuator burned out when vehicle was paused for about fifty minutes.
16.	RASCAL	SciAutonics/Auburn Engineering	Thousand Oaks, California	DNF	Out of race at 16 miles; software problems
17.	Desert Tortoise	Intelligent Vehicle Safety Technologies	Littleton, Colorado	DNF	Out of race at 14 miles, instability in steering controller caused robot to drive offroad for a power pole.
18.	NaviGATOR	Team CIMAR	University of Florida, Gainesville, Florida	DNF	Out of race at 14 miles; faulty reporting of GPS accuracy caused robot to drive into a bush, where a bug in "blocked path" logic left vehicle unable to recover.
19.	Prospect Eleven	Princeton University	Princeton University, Princeton, New Jersey	DNF	Out of race at 10 miles. A code bug slowed down steering and throttle control, sending the robot looping in circles and narrowly missing a clump of reporters.
20.	Spider	Team Cornell	Cornell University, Ithaca, New York	DNF	Out of race at 9 miles; when pause applied, rolled up against a guard rail; when unpaused, could not back away from rail since it had no functional backing software
21.	Alice	Team Caltech	California Institute of Technology, Pasadena, California	DNF	Out of race at 8 miles; after GPS reacquisition, veered over barrier and towards media
22.	JackBot	MonsterMoto	Cedar Park, Texas	DNF	Out of race at 7 miles
23.	The Meteor	Mitre Meteorites	MITRE, McLean, Virginia	DNF	Out of race at 1 mile; dust interfered with sensors causing false positive obstacle detection

DNF = did not finish

=== Team sites ===
- American Industrial Magic
- Autonomous Vehicle Engineers (Team AVE)
- Autonomous Vehicle Systems (semi-finalist 2005)
- A.I. Motorvators (semi-finalist 2004, 2005)
- Armani Archived 2019-05-21 at the Wayback Machine(dead link, leave for history)
- Austin Robot Technology (semi-finalist 2005)
- Axion Racing (finalist 2004, 2005)
- BJB Engineering (semi-finalist 2005)
- Blue Revolution Racing(dead link, leave for history)
- BYUc Archived 2007-12-08 at the Wayback Machine (New team 2007)
- Blue Team (finalist 2004; semi-finalist 2005)
- CarOLO
- Cornell DARPA Team (finalist 2005)
- CyberRider (semi-finalist 2004, 2005)
- Desert Buckeyes Archived 2005-10-27 at the Wayback Machine (2004, finalist 2005)
- FutureNowa Archived 2007-09-29 at the Wayback Machine
- Grand Challenge Autonomous Race Team
- Gray Team (finisher 2005)
- The Golem Group (finalist 2004, 2005)
- Highlander Racing
- Insight Racing (semi-finalist 2004; finalist 2005)
- KNetX
- Maximum Exposure (dead link, leave for history)
- Mech I.Q. (dead link, leave for history)
- MonsterMoto JackBot (finalist 2005)
- MITRE Meteorites (finalist 2005)
- Oregon WAVE (semi-finalist 2005)
- The Palos Verdes High School Road Warriors (finalist 2004; semi-finalist 2005)
- Princeton University (finalist 2005)
- The Prodigies
- Red Team Archived 2006-04-24 at the Wayback Machine (finalist 2004; finisher 2005)
- Red Team Too Archived 2006-04-24 at the Wayback Machine (finisher 2005)
- ROVER SYSTEMS (semi-finalist 2004)
- R Junk Works Archived 2006-10-20 at the Wayback Machine
- Stanford Racing Team Archived 2004-09-26 at the Wayback Machine (winner 2005)
- Sting Racing at Georgia Tech (new team 2007)
- SciAutonics (finalist 2004, 2005)
- SciAutonics II (finalist 2004)
- Tartan Racing (New CMU Team)
- Team 1010Delta (dead link, leave for history)
- Team Aggie Spirit - UC Davis (dead link, leave for history)
- Team Arctic Tortoise (semi-finalist 2004)
- Team Blue Revolution (dead link, leave for history)
- Team CajunBot Archived 2008-09-08 at the Wayback Machine (finalist 2004, 2005)
- Team Tormenta (semi-finalist 2005)
- Team Cal Poly
- Team Caltech (finalist 2004, 2005)
- Team Case (Combined with Team ENSCO)
- Team CIMAR (finalist 2004, 2005)
- Team Cybernet (2007 Site Visit Qualified)
- Team ENSCO (finalist 2004, 2005)
- Team Go It Alone
- Team Jefferson (semi-finalist 2005)
- Team Mexico Archived 2007-10-26 at the Wayback Machine (new team 2007)
- Team Overbot (semi-finalist 2004, 2005)
- Team Rambo (dead link, leave for history)
- Team Remote-I
- Team Scorpion
- Team South Carolina (dead link, leave for history)
- Team Terramax (finalist 2004; finisher 2005)
- Team Thunderbird - UBC
- Team Underdawg Archived 2007-10-09 at the Wayback Machine
- Team Visionary Endeavor – Fox Valley Technical College
- UCF Team Knightrider
- Viva Las Vegas (dead link, leave for history)
- Virginia Tech Grand Challenge Team Rocky (finalist 2005)
- Virginia Tech Grand Challenge Team Cliff (finalist 2004, 2005)
