= CajunBot =

Autonomous ground vehicles developed by the University of Louisiana at Lafayette

CajunBot refers to the autonomous ground vehicles developed by the University of Louisiana at Lafayette for the DARPA Grand Challenges. CajunBot was featured on CNN and on the Discovery Channel science series Robocars.

CajunBot's custom AGV software, CBSystem, has artificial intelligence path planning capabilities, as well as visualization and simulation components.

The hardware repertoire of CajunBot includes a high grade GPS/INS positioning unit to navigate a designated route while detecting and avoiding obstacles using LIDAR laser-ranging units.

== History ==
=== Inception and the 2004 Grand Challenge ===
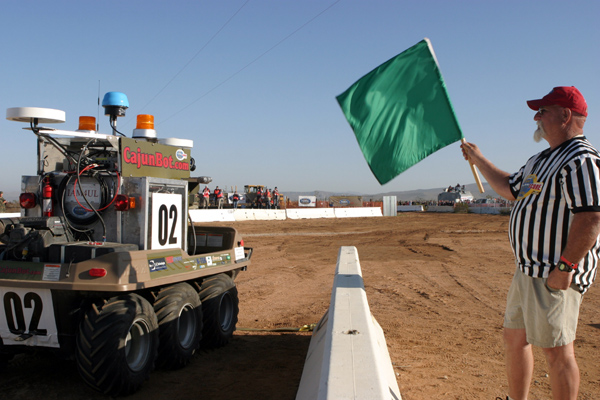
CajunBot leaves the start chute at the 2004 DARPA Grand Challenge Final Event.

CajunBot team members at 2004 DARPA Grand Challenge

In 2002, DARPA announced the first Grand Challenge: "Build a robotic vehicle able to travel unassisted on a predefined path of about 130 miles through the Mojave Desert. The fastest robot to navigate the course in less than 10 hours will take home $1 million." The first competition was scheduled in March 2004.

After learning of the Challenge in 2003, a small group of UL Lafayette students and professors joined to see if they could take on the task of designing a completely autonomous vehicle. "GPS Bot" was engineered as a proof-of-concept, using a small remote controlled car coupled with a micro controller and GPS sensor. "GPS Bot" was able to navigate pre-programmed GPS waypoints without any human interaction.

Branding themselves as "Team CajunBot", (UL Lafayette's athletic teams are referred to as the Ragin' Cajuns) the group was able to have the first CajunBot vehicle ready within a few short months. "CajunBot" was built on a 6-wheeled all-terrain vehicle commonly used for hunting in the swamps and marshlands.

Team CajunBot, energized by the tremendous support from the Lafayette community, defied odds and competed successfully in the qualification rounds, earning a place among the 13 teams selected to compete in the finals, out of 106 initial applicants.

No team managed to complete the 2004 Grand Challenge course, but DARPA was encouraged by the results. It brought together engineers and inventors and managed to channel their energies into the development of important technologies designed to save American lives on the battlefield.

=== 2005 Grand Challenge ===
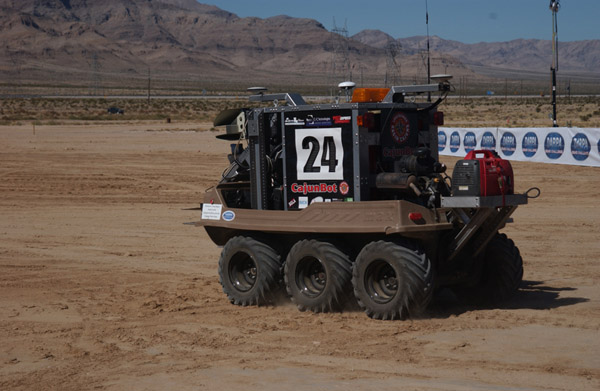
CajunBot at 2005 Grand Challenge National Qualifying Event

In 2005 DARPA repeated the Challenge, fielded more than 198 team entries. Team CajunBot, again, successfully passed the qualification rounds and earned a place among 23 teams selected to compete in the finals.

In the 2005, Grand Challenge, a pivotal moment in autonomous vehicle technology was marked when Stanford University's robotic vehicle, Stanley, successfully completed the 132-mile desert course in 6 hours and 52 minutes, securing first place. This event, organized by the Defense Advanced Research Projects Agency (DARPA), showcased the significant advancements in autonomous navigation and vehicle intelligence, setting a precedent for future innovations in the field.

As envisioned by DARPA, the 2004 and 2005 Grand Challenges successfully accelerated development of the core technology behind fully autonomous battlefield vehicles. But the technology was hardly battle ready.

=== 2007 Urban Challenge ===
DARPA Urban Challenge 2007 opening ceremony

Building on the success of previous challenges, DARPA launched a new competition, dubbed the "Urban Challenge". The event took place in November 2007, set in Victorville, California.

The Urban Challenge required teams "to build a robotic vehicle that can operate in urban traffic, finding its own path while also following traffic rules".

Each team was provided a GPS map of an urban cityscape, simulating military supply missions in an urban setting. Traveling among manned and robotic vehicle traffic, the team vehicles traveled through required points in the mock city. Teams were required to complete the 60-mile course safely in less than six hours.

Team CajunBot was a semi-finalist. being eliminated in the final round of cuts due to an unexpected collision with a roadside vehicle. The team's progress leading up to the challenge was documented in the Discovery Science series Robocars.

== Vehicles ==
=== CajunBot ===
- Platform: A MAX 6-wheel amphibious all-terrain vehicle with a 25 hp twin-cylinder engine. Fuel capacity of 35 gallons. Top speed 30+ mph. Total weight 1,200 lbs.
- Electronics: Controlled by 2 high-speed AMD computers with a distributed memory system, several microcontrollers, and many custom circuits. A 2-kilowatt electric generator supplies the electrical power.
- Sensors: Two scanning LIDAR laser systems, three Doppler radars, and sonar help detect obstacles. C-Nav differential GPS and an Oxford inertial navigation sensor provide exact location information.
- Software: CBSystem software developed by Team CajunBot does everything from object detection to path planning. Advanced Artificial Intelligence (AI) software developed at UL Lafayette allows CajunBot to pick the shortest path while avoiding obstacles.
- Estimated Cost: $15,000 vehicle, $90,000 electronics, and $70,000 in-kind loaner equipment. Total hardware: $175,000. Not including thousands of hours of custom programming.

=== CajunBot-II (a.k.a. Ragin'Bot) ===
- Platform: A 2004 Jeep Wrangler Rubicon with a 4.0 liter gasoline engine and automatic transmission with 4-wheel drive.
- Electronics: Ragin'Bot houses many devices to enable sensor processing and autonomous vehicle control. The CajunBot software "CBSystem" runs on three EPIC form factor computers, each powered by a 1.8 GHz Intel Pentium M processor, housed in a single 1U rackmount case. Several devices convert various serial communications to Ethernet so data can be collected by all computers in the case of a failure of one computer. A custom dual alternator system powers the vehicle and onboard electronics. Redundant DC-to-DC converters transform the alternator voltage into a form usable by the various devices. A custom electronics box (EBOX) houses emergency stop control hardware and provides a central connection for all vehicle control hardware.
- Sensors: Two Ibeo LIDAR sensors, three SICK LIDAR sensors and two Eaton Vorad Doppler radar detect obstacles. An Iteris lane departure warning system provides information about the position of the vehicle on the road. A C-Nav GPS receiver provides StarFire differential corrections, and an Oxford inertial navigation sensor provides Kalman filter smoothing for GPS data and motion compensation via MEMS gyros and accelerometers.
- Software: CBSystem developed by Team CajunBot does everything from object detection to path planning. Advanced Artificial Intelligence (AI) software developed at UL Lafayette allows Ragin'Bot to pick the shortest path while avoiding obstacles.

== Software ==
CajunBot's custom AGV software, CBSystem, was primarily developed in C++ for use on the Linux operating system.

Capabilities of CBSystem:

- Urban path planning for navigation of an RNDF network, while handling lane blockages, stalled vehicles, intersection precedence & queuing, free zone navigation, and parking behavior.
- Static and dynamic obstacle detection.
- Visualization of real time sensor data and path planner status, as well as visualization of logged data and simulation data.
- PID-based steering controller.
- Simulation via a physics-based simulator built on the Open Dynamics Engine, for simulating the wheels, mass, and suspension of the vehicle, as well as traffic vehicles, point clouds from laser sensors, and more.

== CajunBot day ==
On June 2, 2004, Governor Kathleen Babineaux Blanco officially declared Wednesday to be known as "CajunBot day". On this day, the CajunBot vehicle climbed 12 steps of the Louisiana state capital building as Gov. Blanco declared it "an outstanding example of the brainpower we have here in Louisiana and at our universities."

== CNN segment ==
"CajunBot - a six-wheeled all-terrain vehicle - will be traveling across 210 miles of desert terrain as part of a challenge set forth by the Defense Advanced Research Projects Agency of the U.S. Department of Defense. Team CajunBot most recently gained national media attention when CNN visited the UL Lafayette campus for a segment on its show Next@CNN."

"CNN producer Marsha Walton said the crew decided on CajunBot as a subject because of its uniqueness and freshness to the contest."

== Robocars documentary ==
During the 2007 Urban Challenge, CajunBot was one of 10 teams selected to be featured on the Discovery Channel science series "Robocars". The 6-part documentary series chronicled the progress of the teams as they struggled for the $2 million grand prize.

Team CajunBot was featured prominently in the 2nd and 3rd episodes, which aired July 21 & 28 2008, respectively.

== Algorithms ==
Some research papers produced from the CajunBot project:

- C. Cavanaugh, Design and Integration of the Sensing and Control Subsystems of CajunBot, April 9, 2004 (PDF).
- S. Golconda, Steering Control for a Skid-Steered Autonomous Ground Vehicle at Varying Speed, M.S. Thesis, February 2005 (Full thesis).
- A. Lakhotia, S. Golconda, A. Maida, P. Mejia, A. Puntambekar, G. Seetharaman, and S. Wilson, CajunBot: Architecture and Algorithms, Journal of Field Robotics, 23 (8), 2006, 555–578, doi:10.1002/rob.20129, (Full paper).
- A. Maida, S. Golconda, P. Mejia, A. Lakhotia, and C. Cavanaugh, Subgoal-based local navigation and obstacle avoidance using a grid-distance field, International Journal of Vehicle Autonomous Systems (IJVAS), 4 (2-4), 2006, pp. 122–142, (Full paper).
- V. Venkitarakrishnan, CBWare - Distributed Middleware for Autonomous Ground Vehicles, M.S. Thesis, December 2006 (Thesis: front page, body, PPT Presentation).
- A. Puntambekar, Terrain Mapping and Obstacle Detection for Unmanned Autonomous Ground Robots Without Sensor Stabilization, M.S. Thesis, October 18, 2006 (Full thesis, PPT Presentation).
- Solving Urban Transit Problems using SLAM based Algorithms - December 7, 2006

== See also ==
- Autonomous robot
