= David Stavens =

American computer scientist

- Born: 1982 (age 43–44)
- Citizenship: US
- Education: Stanford University, Princeton University
- Scientific career
- Fields: Self-driving cars, robotics, computer science
- Workplaces: Udacity (co-founder), Stanford Self-Driving Car Team (co-founder), Nines (co-founder)
- Thesis: Learning to Drive: Perception for Autonomous Cars (2011)
- Doctoral advisor: Sebastian Thrun
- Other academic advisors: Andrew Ng, Fei-Fei Li

David Stavens is an American entrepreneur and scientist. He has made significant contributions to the field of AI, co-founding the team that developed Stanley, the self-driving car that led to Google's Waymo, as well as Udacity, an online education platform for technology and AI that has educated millions globally. He also co-founded Nines, a company that built AI-enabled, FDA-approved medical devices. Stavens has published in the fields of robotics, machine learning, and artificial intelligence, and has contributed to starting companies with an aggregate market value of over $30 billion.

== Early life and education ==
Stavens grew up in Sioux City, Iowa and attended Princeton University, graduating with a B.S.E. in Computer Science, Magna Cum Laude, at age 19. He is an alumnus of Stanford University's Computer Science department for both M.S. and Ph.D. programs. His Ph.D. was advised by Sebastian Thrun.

== Autonomous cars ==
Stavens was a co-creator on Stanford's autonomous car team. The team built Stanley, the winner of the second driverless car competition of the DARPA Grand Challenge in 2005. Stanley has been on display in the Smithsonian Institution's National Museum of American History and National Air and Space Museum. Academic publications from the team (by Stavens along with Hendrik Dahlkamp, Adrian Kaehler, Sebastian Thrun, Gary Bradski) state that they applied self-supervised learning, to detect drivable surfaces in the desert for self-driving cars which led the vehicle to win the race. Stavens's publications state that they apply the concept of self-supervised learning to autonomous driving with the benefit of avoiding human intervention. His dissertation states that this self-supervised learning approach has the potential to improve human driving performance. The Stanford Artificial Intelligence Lab awarded Stavens a gold medal "For his groundbreaking contributions to the winning DARPA Grand Challenge vehicle...."

The Stanford autonomous driving team ultimately joined Google as the foundation of Google's self-driving car team (Waymo).

Stavens also made contributions to the 2009 NASA Mars Rover Mission.

== Indoor WiFi maps ==
Stavens worked on research at Stanford on indoor localization using WiFi signal strength measurements. The goal was to create a system capable of delivering GPS-quality localization indoors, where GPS satellites do not function. He and Jesse Levinson were winners of the Qualcomm Innovation Fellowship in 2009 which provided $100,000 in funding for the research.

He published the research along with Joseph Huang, David Milman, Morgan Quigley, Sebastian Thrun, and Alok Aggarwal, stating that it produced excellent results in practice. Joseph Huang went on to found an indoor localization start-up, WifiSLAM, that was acquired by Apple.

== Online education ==
Stavens co-founded and was CEO of Udacity. Udacity helped popularize the concept of the offering college courses for free as Massive open online course's (MOOC), intended to make high-quality education accessible and nearly free around the entire world via Internet.

As CEO, he grew the company to 160,000 students and 20 employees. Udacity was valued at $1 billion in 2015. As of 2018, Udacity had over 50,000 paid students and $70 million in revenue.
