= Ararkis Sandstorm =

Overview
- Manufacturer: Ararkis Automobili
- Production: 2024

Body and chassis
- Doors: 2

Powertrain
- Battery: 115 kWh Lithium-ion
- Electric range: 500 km (310 mi)
- Plug-in charging: 80% in 30 minutes

The Ararkis Sandstorm is a limited-production electric supercar designed and manufactured by Ararkis Automobili, a United Kingdom-based company, founded by South African entrepreneur Priven Reddy. It is still in a developmental state, with a "production prototype" ready in the third quarter of 2024.

== Performance and construction ==
In Theory, Ararkis claims that the car should be able to accelerate from 0 to 100 km/h (62 mph) in 1.5 seconds. If achieved, this would potentially place the Sandstorm among the fastest accelerating electric hypercars in the world. Additionally, the 115 kWh battery is estimated to provide a maximum range of 500 kilometres (310 mi) on a single charge.

The Ararkis Sandstorm features an electric powertrain. It utilizes a pair of permanent magnet synchronous motors (PMSMs). The front and rear have custom, individual motors. The specific power outputs or control details of the motors have not been publicly disclosed.

The Sandstorm uses carbon fiber and recycled materials in the body construction, which aim to reduce the vehicle's overall environmental impact. As an electric vehicle, the Sandstorm produces zero tailpipe emissions during operation.

The Sandstorm has two seats made of magnesium-aluminum alloy, Alcantara, and CFRP. A central touchscreen and wireless features are included.

== Production ==
Reportedly, only 20 Ararkis Sandstorms are planned to be produced, with a starting price of $2 million.
