= Udacity =

For-profit educational organization

Udacity, Inc.
- Website type: Online education
- Available in: English
- Founded: June 2011
- Headquarters: Mountain View, California, US
- Creators: Sebastian Thrun, David Stavens, Mike Sokolsky
- CEO: Kai Roemmelt
- Industry: E-learning
- Revenue: ▲$100 million (2018)
- Parent: Accenture
- Website: udacity.com
- Commercial: Yes
- Registration: Required
- Users: 16.9 million
- Launched: February 2012; 14 years ago
- Current status: Active

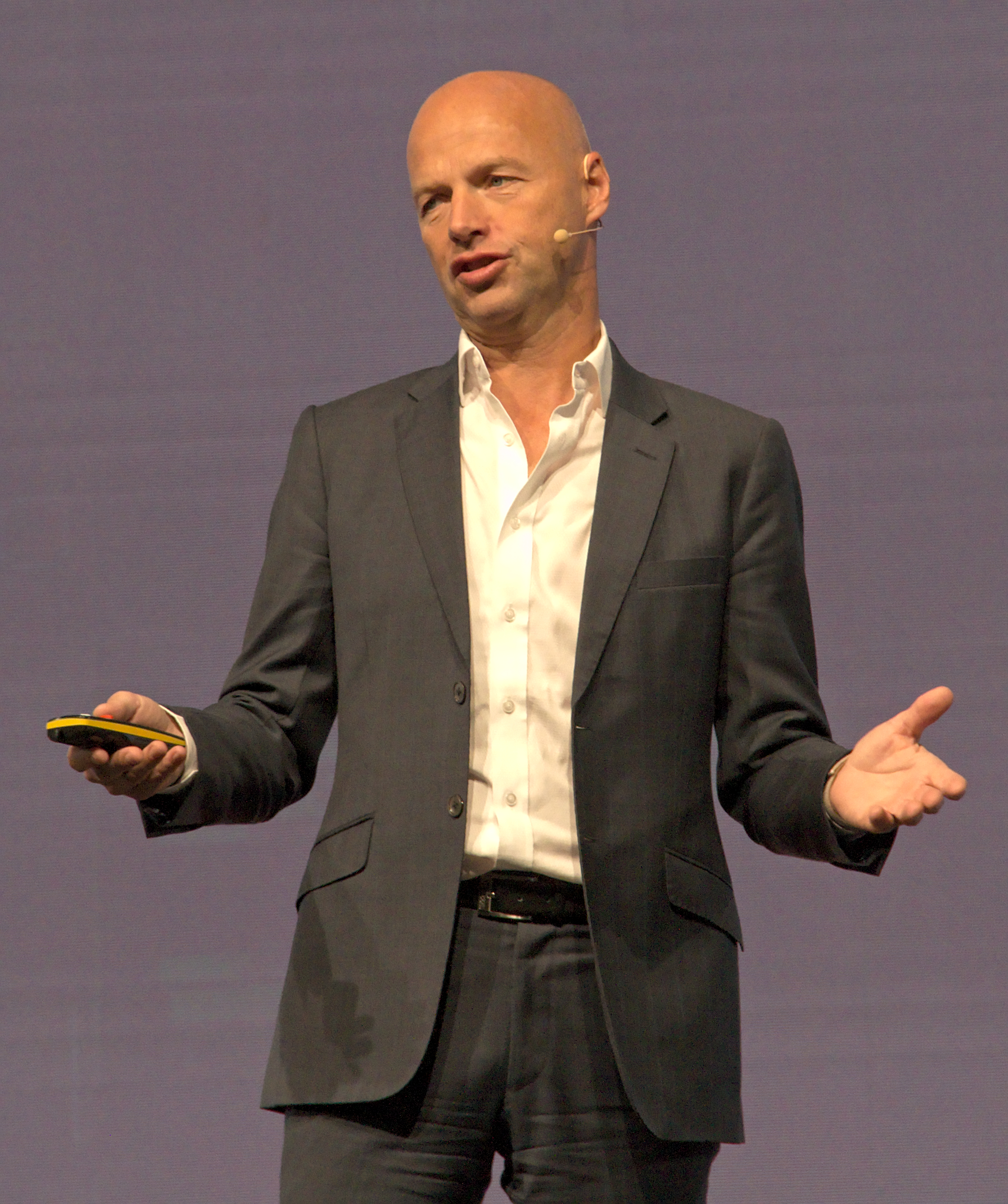
Sebastian Thrun at Frankfurt Motor Show 2019

Udacity, Inc. is an American global for-profit massive open online course provider. It was founded by Sebastian Thrun, David Stavens, and Mike Sokolsky.

According to Thrun, the origin of the name Udacity comes from the company's desire to be "audacious for you, the student". While it originally focused on offering university-style courses, it now focuses more on vocational courses for professionals.

Accenture acquired the company in May 2024.

== History ==
Udacity is the outgrowth of free computer science classes offered in 2011 through Stanford University. Thrun has stated he hopes half a million students will enroll, after an enrollment of 160,000 students in the predecessor course at Stanford, Introduction to Artificial Intelligence, and 90,000 students had enrolled in the initial two classes as of March 2012. Udacity was announced at the 2012 Digital Life Design conference. Udacity is funded by venture capital firm, Charles River Ventures, and $200,000 of Thrun's personal money. In October 2012, the venture capital firm Andreessen Horowitz led the investment of another $15 million in Udacity. In November 2013, Thrun announced in a Fast Company article that Udacity had a "lousy product" and that the service was pivoting to focus more on vocational courses for professionals and "nanodegrees."

In 2014, the Georgia Institute of Technology launched the first "massive online open degree" in computer science by partnering with Udacity and AT&T.

In October 2017, Udacity along with Unity, launched Learn ARKit program which could help developers improve their AR application building skills. In the same month, Google partnered with Udacity to launch a new scholarship initiative for aspiring Web and Android application developers. While not yet profitable as of February 2018, Udacity was valued at over $1 billion having raised $163 million from noted investors included Andreessen Horowitz, Drive Capital, and Alphabet's venture capital arm, GV.

In March 2024, Accenture announced its acquisition of Udacity, which would help support its AI-powered LearnVantage suite, to equip clients with the resources to reskill and upskill their workforce.

== Courses ==
=== Free courses ===
The first two courses on Udacity started on 20 February 2012, as CS 101: Building a Search Engine, taught by David Evans from the University of Virginia, and CS 373: Programming a Robotic Car, taught by Thrun. Both courses use Python.

Four additional courses began on 16 April 2012, encompassing a range of ability and subject matter, with teachers including Steve Huffman and Peter Norvig. Five new courses were announced on 31 May 2012, and marked the first time Udacity offered courses outside the domain of computer science. Four of these courses launched at the start of the third hexamester, on 25 June 2012. One course, Logic & Discrete Mathematics: Foundations of Computing, was delayed for several weeks before an email announcement was sent out on 14 August stating that the course would not be launched, although no further explanation was provided.

On 23 August 2012, a new course in entrepreneurship, EP245 taught by retired serial entrepreneur Steve Blank, was announced. Four new specialized CS courses were announced as part of collaboration with Google, Nvidia, Microsoft, Autodesk, Cadence Design Systems, and Wolfram Research on 18 October 2012, to be launched in early 2013. On 28 November 2012, Thrun's original AI-class from 2011 was relaunched as a course at Udacity, CS271.

=== University credit courses ===
Udacity announced a partnership with San Jose State University (SJSU) on 15 January 2013 to pilot three new courses — two algebra courses and an introductory statistics course (ST095) — available for college credit at SJSU in the Spring 2013 semester, entirely online.

This first pilot resulted in pass rates below the traditional in-person SJSU class for all three courses. One hypothesis was that many of the students who had enrolled online had already taken and failed the traditional course, and therefore were likely to fail again. The pilot was repeated in the summer semester with an increased enrollment cap of 1000. In addition, the pilot was expanded to include two new courses, Intro to Programming (CS046) and General Psychology (PS001). This time, pass rates for the statistics, college algebra, and programming courses exceeded those of the traditional face-to-face course, despite which, the partnership was suspended on 18 July 2013.

=== Nanodegree ===
In June 2014, Udacity and AT&T announced the "Nanodegree" program, designed to teach programming skills needed to qualify for an entry-level IT position at AT&T. AT&T said it will offer paid internships to some graduates of the program.“We can’t turn you into a Nobel laureate,” Mr. Thrun said to a learner. “But what we can do is something like upskilling —you’re a smart person, but the skills you have are inadequate for the current job market, or don’t let you get the job you aspire to have. We can help you get those skills.”

A cybersecurity nanodegree was announced at the RSA Conference in April 2018. As of the beginning of 2022, Udacity offered 78 nanodegrees.

=== Course format ===
Each course consists of several units comprising video lectures with closed captioning, in conjunction with integrated quizzes to help students understand concepts and reinforce ideas, as well as follow-up homework, which promotes a "learn by doing" model. Programming classes use the Python language; programming assignments are graded by automated grading programs on the Udacity servers.

== Enrollment ==
Over the first several months of Udacity's existence, enrollment for each class was cut off on the due date of the first homework assignment, and the courses were re-offered each hexamester. Since August 2012, all courses have been "open enrollment"; students can enroll in one or more courses at any time after a course is launched. All course lectures and problem sets are available upon enrollment and can then be completed at the student's preferred pace.

Udacity had students in 203 countries in the summer of 2012, with the greatest number of students in the United States (42 percent), India (7 percent), Britain (5 percent), and Germany (4 percent). Udacity students for CS101 range from 13-year-olds to 80-year-olds. Advanced 13-year-olds are able to complete multiple, higher-level computer science courses on Udacity. In 2024, the company reported 16.9 million enrolled learners, located across 240 countries.

== Certification ==
Udacity used to issue certificates of completion of individual courses, but since May 2014 has stopped offering free non-identity-verified certificates. In addition, beginning 24 August 2012, through partnership with electronic testing company Pearson VUE, students of CS101 can elect to take an additional proctored 75-minute final exam for a fee of $89 in an effort to allow Udacity classes to "count towards a credential that is recognized by employers".

Further plans announced for certification options would include a "secured online examination" as a less expensive alternative to the in-person proctored exams.

Colorado State University's Global Campus began offering transfer credit for the introductory computer science course (CS101) for Udacity students that take the final examination through a secure testing facility.

In 2015, Udacity started the Nanodegree program, it is a paid credential program. Udacity also offers Nanodegree plus, for a higher fee, with a job guarantee, although it planned to cancel the program.

== Awards ==
In November 2012, founder Sebastian Thrun won the Smithsonian American Ingenuity in Education Award for his work with Udacity.

== Spin-off company ==
In April 2017, Udacity announced a spin-off venture called Voyage Auto, a self-driving car taxi company to compete with the likes of the Uber ride-hailing service. The company has been testing its project, based on production consumer vehicles, on low-speed private roads in a retirement community in San Jose, California. In 2018, Voyage announced a ride-hailing partnership with The Villages, Florida, another retirement community. In March 2021, Voyage was acquired by Cruise.

== See also ==
- FutureLearn
- Coursera
- Eliademy
- Khan Academy
- LinkedIn Learning
- Saylor Academy
- TechChange
- NIIT
- Udemy
