= RNDF =

The Route Network Definition File (RNDF) specifies accessible road segments and provides information such as waypoints, stop sign locations, lane widths, checkpoint locations, and parking spot locations. The route network has no implied start or end point. In addition to road segments, the RNDF specifies free-travel ‘zones’ that have a defined perimeter, but for which no waypoints are provided. Zones are used to represent parking lots and areas with moving or stationary obstacles or vehicles. It is used by DARPA for its Grand Challenge program.
