= Sebastian Thrun =

German-American entrepreneur (born 1967)

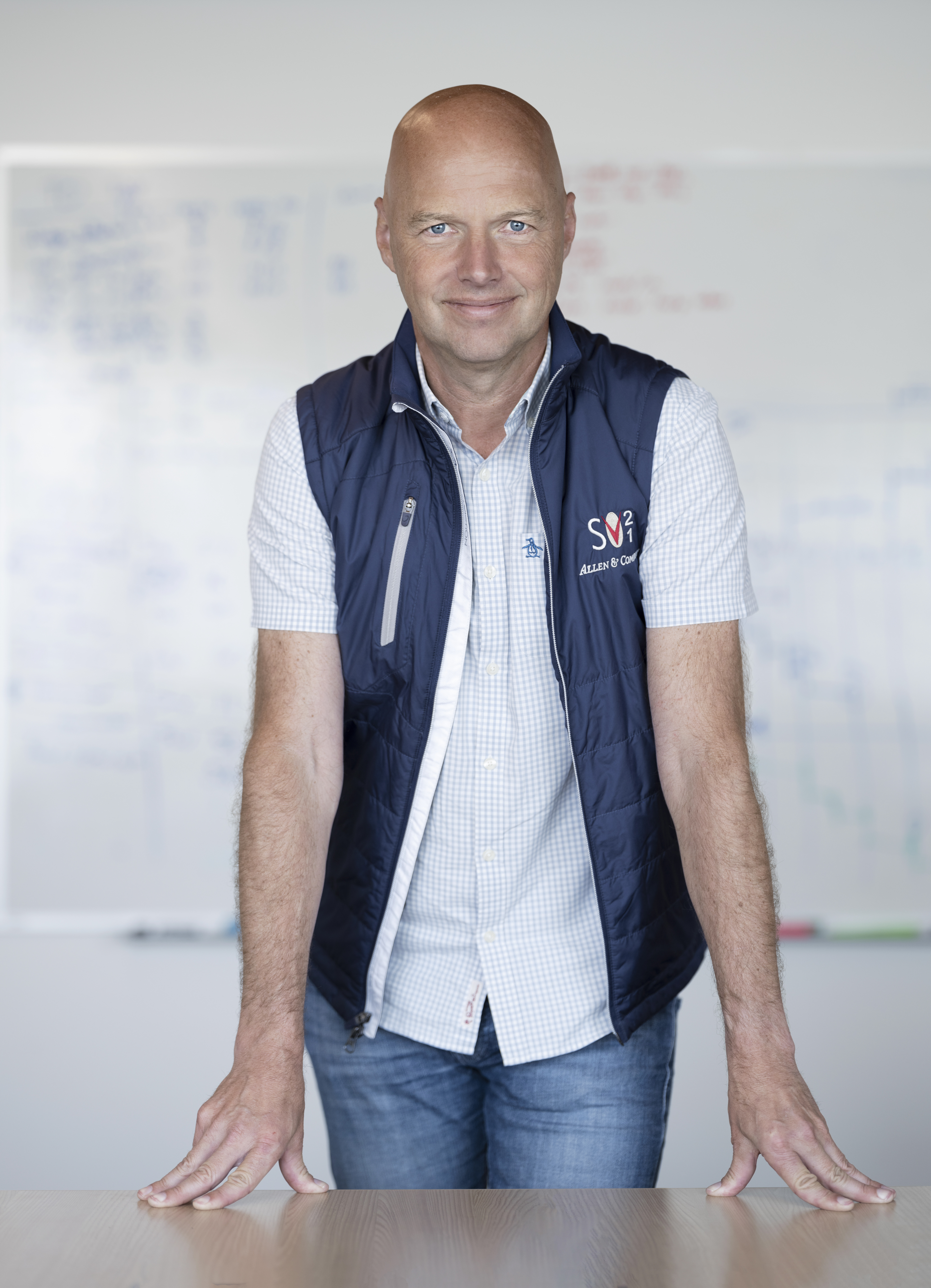
- Thrun in 2021
- Born: May 14, 1967 (age 59); Solingen, West Germany
- Citizenship: United States, Germany
- Education: University of Bonn; University of Hildesheim
- Awards: National Science Foundation CAREER Award (2003); AAAI Fellow (2006); DARPA Grand Challenge (2005)
- Scientific career
- Fields: Artificial Intelligence; Robotics
- Workplaces: Google X Lab (co-founder); Stanford University; Carnegie Mellon University; Udacity (co-founder)
- Thesis: Explanation-Based Neural Network Learning: A Lifelong Learning Approach (1995)
- Doctoral advisor: Armin B. Cremers; Tom Mitchell
- Doctoral students: Frank Dellaert; John Langford; Joëlle Pineau; David Stavens
- Website: robots.stanford.edu

Signature
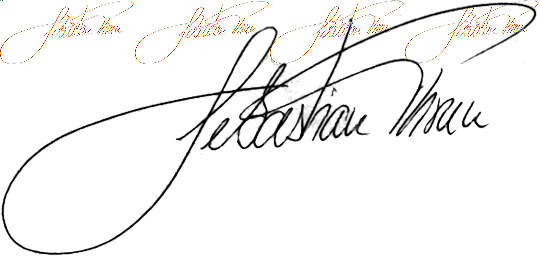

Sebastian Thrun (born May 14, 1967) is a German-American computer scientist, entrepreneur, and educator. He is an adjunct professor at Stanford University and is known for his work in self-driving cars, robotics, artificial intelligence, and online education. He is the co-founder of Google X, co-founder of Udacity, and former chief executive officer of Kitty Hawk Corporation.

He is widely recognized for his contributions to autonomous driving systems, particularly as leader of the Google Chauffeur Project (now known as Waymo) and as the leader of the Stanford Racing that won the 2005 DARPA Grand Challenge, an event widely credited with accelerating research in self-driving technology.

== Early life and education ==
Thrun was born in Solingen, West Germany, to Winfried and Kristin (Grüner) Thrun. He studied computer science, economics, and medicine at the University of Hildesheim, where he earned his Vordiplom (intermediate diploma) in 1988.

He later transferred to the University of Bonn, receiving a Diplom in 1993 and completing a PhD summa cum laude in computer science and statistics in 1995. His doctoral dissertation, Explanation-Based Neural Network Learning: A Lifelong Learning Approach, was supervised by Armin B. Cremers and Tom Mitchell.

== Career ==
=== Academic career ===
==== Carnegie Mellon University ====
In 1995, Thrun joined Carnegie Mellon University as a research computer scientist in the Computer Science Department.

In 1998, he became assistant professor and director of the Robot Learning Laboratory, later serving as the Finmeccanica Associate Professor of Computer Science and Robotics.

During this period, he developed Minerva, an autonomous robotic museum tour guide deployed at the Smithsonian National Museum of American History in 1998. The robot interacted with thousands of visitors over a two-week deployment and contributed to advances in simultaneous localization and mapping (SLAM). He also led the Nursebot project, which focused on assistive robots in elder care environments.

Thrun co-founded the Center for Automated Learning and Discovery (CALD), later renamed the Machine Learning Department, recognized as the first academic department dedicated to machine learning. He co-chaired its early graduate program, the Master’s in Automated Learning and Discovery, which formed the basis for later machine learning doctoral programs at Carnegie Mellon University.

==== Stanford University ====
In 2003, Thrun joined Stanford University as an associate professor. In 2004, he re-established the Stanford Artificial Intelligence Laboratory (SAIL), originally founded in 1963 by John McCarthy, and served as its director. He was promoted to full professor of computer science and electrical engineering in 2007.

At Stanford, he led the development of Stanley, the autonomous vehicle that won the 2005 DARPA Grand Challenge by completing a 212-kilometer desert course in approximately 6 hours and 54 minutes, earning a $2 million prize. The vehicle is now housed at the Smithsonian Institution’s National Museum of American History.His team also developed Junior, which placed second in the 2007 DARPA Urban Challenge.

In 2004, Thrun founded the Robotics: Science and Systems (RSS) conference, which has since become a major venue in robotics research. He now serves as an adjunct professor at Stanford.

=== Google ===
In 2011, Thrun joined Google as a Google Fellow and Vice President. He co-founded Google X (the “moonshot factory”) with Yoky Matsuoka and Astro Teller, an advanced research lab focused on experimental and high-risk technology projects.

In X, he initiated Project Chauffeur, Google’s autonomous vehicle program, which later became Waymo in 2016. Waymo has since developed into one of the major autonomous ride-hailing companies, operating large-scale autonomous driving systems on public roads.

He also co-founded Google Brain, a deep learning research initiative that contributed to large-scale neural network systems used in products such as YouTube and later influenced the development of transformer-based architectures. Google Brain later merged with DeepMind to form Google DeepMind, and today forms the backbone of Google’s Gemini platform.

During his tenure at Google, Thrun was involved in several additional initiatives, including Google Street View (2007), which originated from mapping research conducted at Stanford University; Google Glass (2012), a wearable computing platform; Project Ground Truth, which contributed to the development and refinement of Google Maps data systems; Project Wing, a drone-based delivery initiative; Project Loon, a high-altitude balloon internet access project that was discontinued in 2021; and GCam, a computational photography system used in Google’s Pixel smartphones.

=== Udacity and education initiatives ===
In 2011, Thrun taught a free online artificial intelligence course at Stanford University, which attracted approximately 160,000 students from 190 countries and became a major early event in the massive open online course (MOOC) movement. He is often referred to in media as the “Godfather of the MOOC.”

In 2012, he co-founded Udacity, an online education company focused on technical training and “nanodegree” programs. The platform has served tens of millions of learners globally. In 2024, Udacity was sold to Accenture.

Thrun also collaborated with Georgia Tech and Zvi Galil to develop the Online Master of Science in Computer Science (OMSCS), a low-cost online graduate degree program. The program has graduated more than 10,000 students and has been described by Forbes as “The Greatest Degree Program Ever.”

=== Kitty Hawk and Wisk Aero ===
Thrun co-founded Zee.Aero with Larry Page, a company focused on electric vertical takeoff and landing (eVTOL) aircraft, which later became Kitty Hawk Corporation, where he served as CEO. The company developed the Flyer, a personal electric vertical takeoff and landing (eVTOL) aircraft designed to enable rapid pilot training, and Cora, an autonomous air taxi prototype.

In 2019, the Cora program was separated into a joint venture with Boeing under the name Wisk Aero, which continues to develop autonomous aircraft for urban air mobility applications. Kitty Hawk subsequently ceased operations.

=== Other ventures ===
Thrun co-founded Cresta in 2017, a company focused on AI systems for contact centers that provide real-time assistance, automation, and workflow optimization for customer service operations.

He also founded Sage AI Labs, which developed “GOLD,” an AI-based shopping platform focused on personalized and automated commerce experiences using agent-based systems.

== Research contributions ==
=== Autonomous vehicles ===
Thrun is widely recognized for his contributions to autonomous driving systems. His work includes leadership of the Stanford Racing Team’s Stanley vehicle, which won the 2005 DARPA Grand Challenge; development of Junior, which placed second in the 2007 DARPA Urban Challenge; and foundational work at Google that led to Project Chauffeur, later developed into Waymo.

His research contributed to perception systems, navigation, probabilistic decision-making, and large-scale robotic autonomy.

=== Probabilistic robotics ===
Together with Wolfram Burgard and Dieter Fox, Thrun helped establish probabilistic robotics, a field that applies statistical methods to robotics problems such as localization, mapping, and navigation.

Their book Probabilistic Robotics (2005, MIT Press) is widely used in the field and has been translated into multiple languages.

Key contributions include Monte Carlo localization, simultaneous localization and mapping (SLAM), and probabilistic mapping and navigation algorithms.

=== Interactive robots ===
Thrun’s early work includes the development of autonomous and interactive robotic systems such as Rhino (University of Bonn, 1994), one of the earliest autonomous museum tour guide robots; Minerva (1998), deployed at the Smithsonian museum; the Nursebot project, focused on assistive robotics in healthcare environments; and collaborative work on mine-mapping robotics with William L. Whittaker.

=== Projects at Google and Google X ===
Thrun contributed to or co-founded several projects at Google and Google X:

- Google Street View (2007): Panoramic mapping imagery system; Active
- Google X (~2010): Experimental research laboratory (“moonshot factory”); Active
- Google Brain (2011): Deep learning research division; later merged into Google DeepMind
- Project Chauffeur (Waymo) (2009): Autonomous vehicle program; Active
- Google Glass (2012): Wearable computing platform; Discontinued (consumer)
- Project Ground Truth (~2008): Mapping data infrastructure; Active
- Project Wing (~2012): Drone delivery system; Active (Alphabet subsidiary)
- Project Loon (~2011): Balloon-based internet system; Shut down (2021)
- GCam (2011): Computational photography system; Active

== Awards and recognition ==
=== Honorary doctorates ===
- Delft University of Technology (2016)
- Instituto Politécnico Nacional (2016)
- University of Hildesheim (2020).
- Georgia Institute of Technology (2024)

Academy memberships

- National Academy of Engineering (2007)
- German Academy of Sciences Leopoldina (2007)
- AAAI Fellow (2006)
- EurAI Fellow (2006)

=== Selected awards ===
- DARPA Grand Challenge winner (2005)
- NSF CAREER Award (1999)
- Olympus Award by the German Society for Pattern Recognition (2001)
- World Technology Award (2006)
- Braunschweig Research Prize (2007)
- IEEE ITSS Distinguished Researcher Award (2010)
- Crunchie / TechCrunch Award (2010)
- Max Planck Research Award (2011)
- AAAI Ed Feigenbaum Prize (2011)
- Smithsonian American Ingenuity Award (2012)
- Carnegie Corporation Great Immigrants Award (2013)
- IEEE ICRA Milestone Award (2020)
- Carl-Friedrich Gauss Medal (2022)
- Lamarr Award (2024)

=== Recognition in media and rankings ===
- Named one of the "Brilliant 10" by Popular Science in 2005
- Scientific American 50 (2006)
- Named as the fifth-most creative person in the business world by Fast Company in 2011
- No. 4 on Foreign Policy magazine's Top 100 Global Thinkers of 2012
- Wired 25 (2018)
- ScholarGPS ranking: #2 worldwide in robotics (2025)

== Selected publications ==
- Thrun, S.; Burgard, W.; Fox, D. Probabilistic Robotics. MIT Press, 2005
- Thrun et al. “Stanley: The robot that won the DARPA Grand Challenge.” Journal of Field Robotics (2006).
- Fox et al. “Monte Carlo Localization.” AAAI (1999).
- Thrun. “Learning Metric-Topological Maps for Indoor Navigation.” Artificial Intelligence (1998).
- Thrun et al. “Probabilistic Algorithms and the Interactive Museum Tour-Guide Robot Minerva.” IJRR (2000).
- Thrun. PhD thesis (1995), University of Bonn.
