= Lucy Gray Mountains =

Mountain range in Nevada, United States

- Location within Nevada

Highest point
- Elevation: 1,302 m (4,272 ft)

Geography
- Country: United States
- State: Nevada
- District: Clark County
- Range coordinates: 35°36′29.941″N 115°16′45.962″W
- Borders on: W: Ivanpah Valley; E: McCullough Range
- Topo map: USGS Desert

The Lucy Gray Mountains are a mountain range in Clark County, Nevada.Beer Bottle Pass is at the northern end of the range, east of Roach Lake. A small portion of the mountains in the southwest is in San Bernardino County, California. The Ivanpah Valley is to the southwest; the McCullough Range is to the east.
