= H1ghlander =

Autonomous vehicle

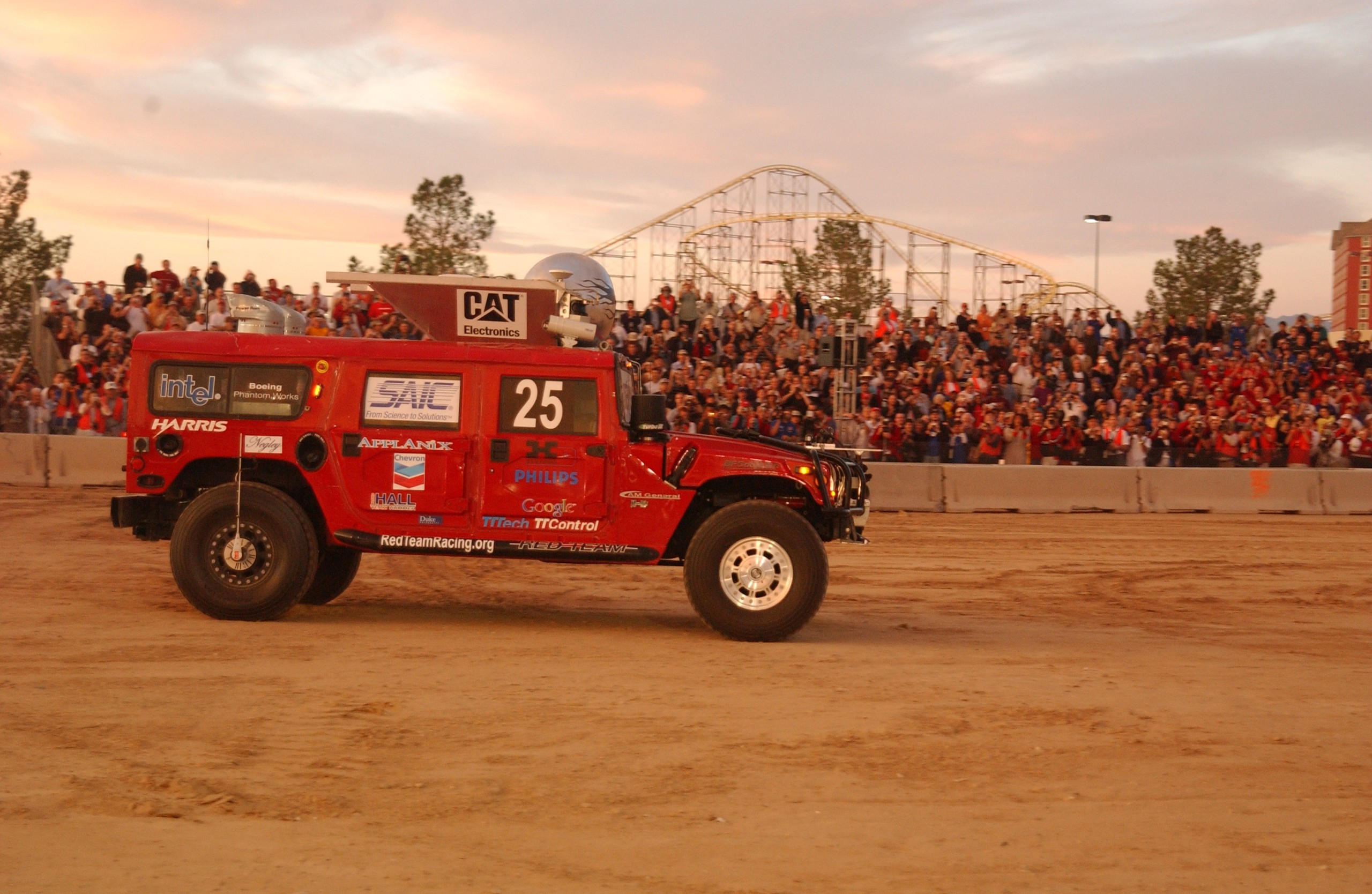
H1ghlander beginning its part of the race

H1ghlander is an autonomous vehicle. Created by Carnegie Mellon University's Red Team, it is a heavily modified 1999 HUMMER H1. It competed in the 2005 DARPA Grand Challenge.

The sensors used by H1ghlander include LIDAR laser-ranging units, one steerable LIDAR (in the globe on top), GPS and an inertial navigation system. The GPS/INS system was an Applanix POS/LV system.

== DARPA Grand Challenge ==
H1ghlander competed in the 2005 DARPA Grand Challenge on October 8, qualifying in the pole position and finished in 7 hours and 14 minutes, placing 3rd out of the five vehicles to complete the 132 mile (212 km) course. It was preceded, in second place, by Sandstorm, its sister vehicle.

== Cultural references ==
The Hummer driven by Denzel Washington in the movie Déjà Vu was heavily based on H1ghlander, sharing a similar gimbal dome on the top, SICK laser sensors in the same positions, a camera tube on the side of the vehicle, and many other visual similarities. See IMDB Trivia for Déjà Vu.

== See also ==
- Driverless car
