= Applanix =

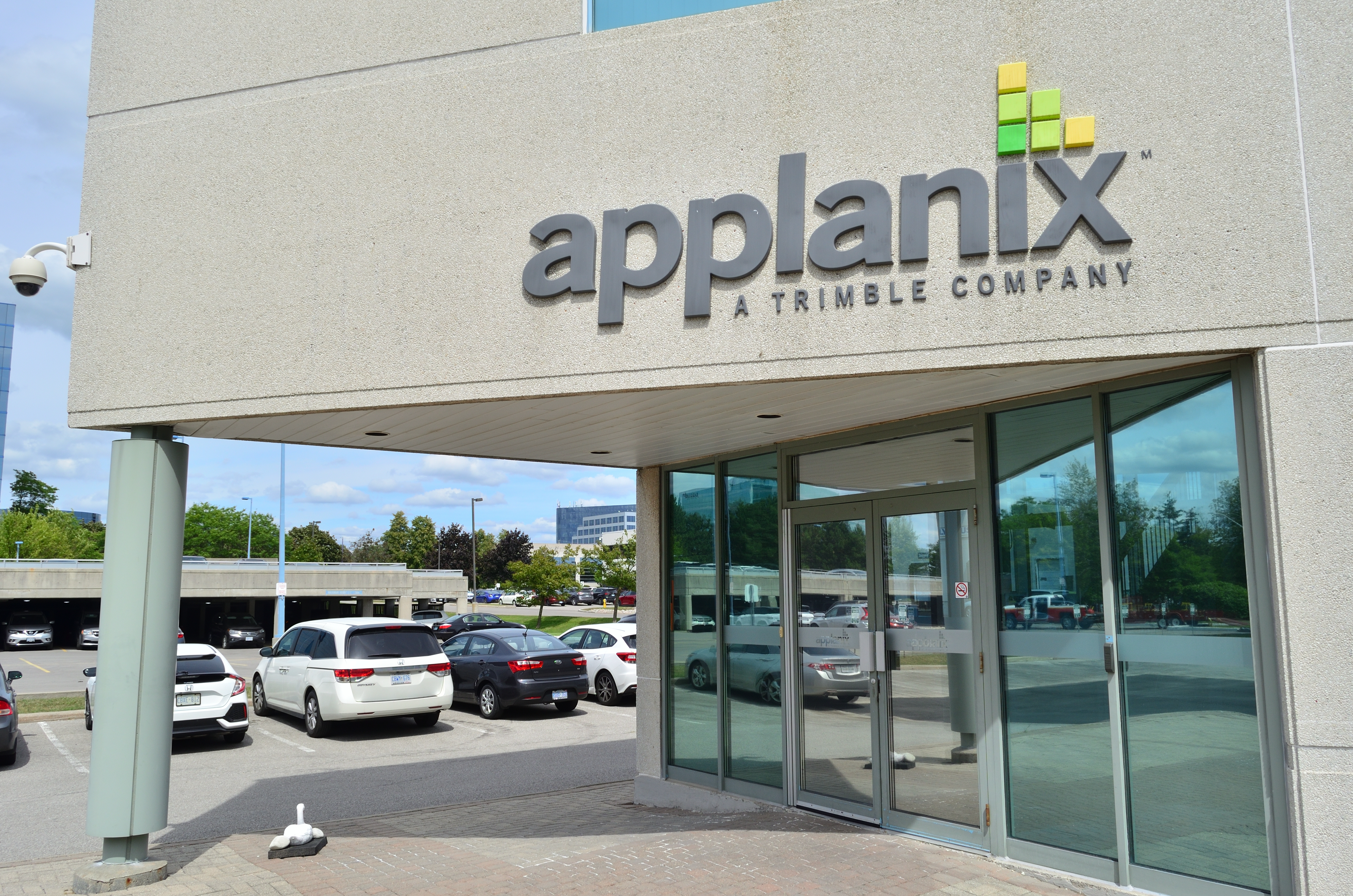
- Company type: Wholly owned subsidiary of Trimble Inc
- Founded: Markham, Canada (1991)
- Headquarters: Richmond Hill, Ontario, Canada
- Website: www.applanix.com

Applanix, based in Richmond Hill, Ontario, Canada, develops and manufactures a line of Inertial Navigation System products. The company's Position and Orientation Systems (POS) are used worldwide for a variety of applications such as aerial survey and mapping, remote sensing, road profiling, GIS data acquisition, and hydrographic surveying.

== History ==
Applanix, founded in February 1991 as Applied Analytics Corporation, is a spin-off of Honeywell's Advanced Technology Centre. In its first two years of its operation, Applied Analytics provided engineering services in integrated inertial systems and real-time image processing for aerospace. Since 1993, and through an extensive technology conversion effort, Applanix has increasingly specialized in providing off-the-shelf Position and Orientation Systems (POS) using integrated inertial/GPS technology.

On June 20, 2003 Trimble Inc announced that it had agreed to purchase Applanix in a stock transaction valued at CAD$25 million (approximately US$18.6 million). Trimble expected the acquisition to extend its technology portfolio and enable increased robustness and capabilities in its future positioning products.
