= Stanley (vehicle) =

Autonomous car

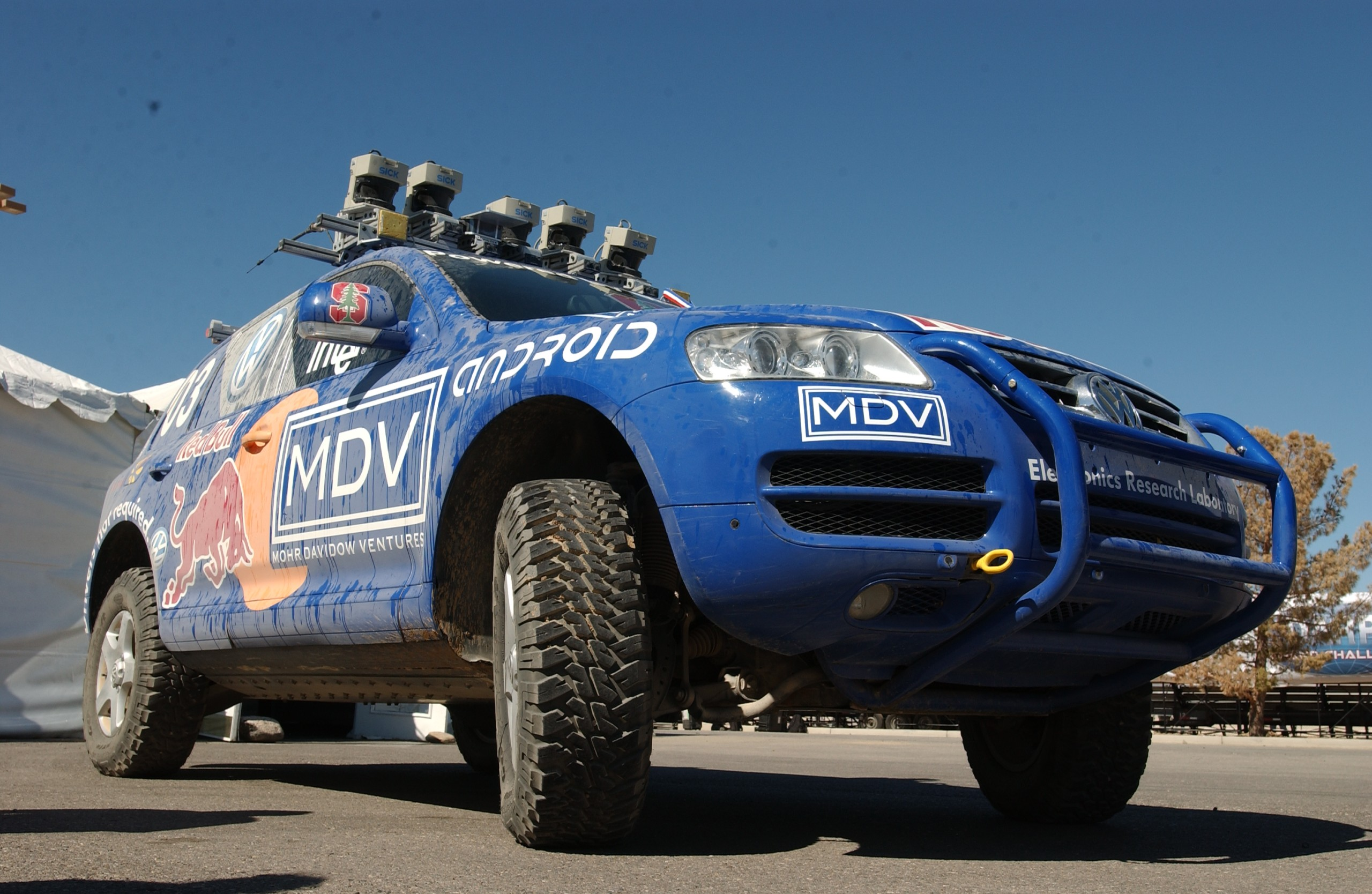
Stanley parked after the 2005 DARPA Grand Challenge

Stanley is an autonomous car created by Stanford University's Stanford Racing Team in cooperation with the Volkswagen Electronics Research Laboratory (ERL). It won the 2005 DARPA Grand Challenge, earning the Stanford Racing Team a $2 million prize.

== The Stanford racing team ==
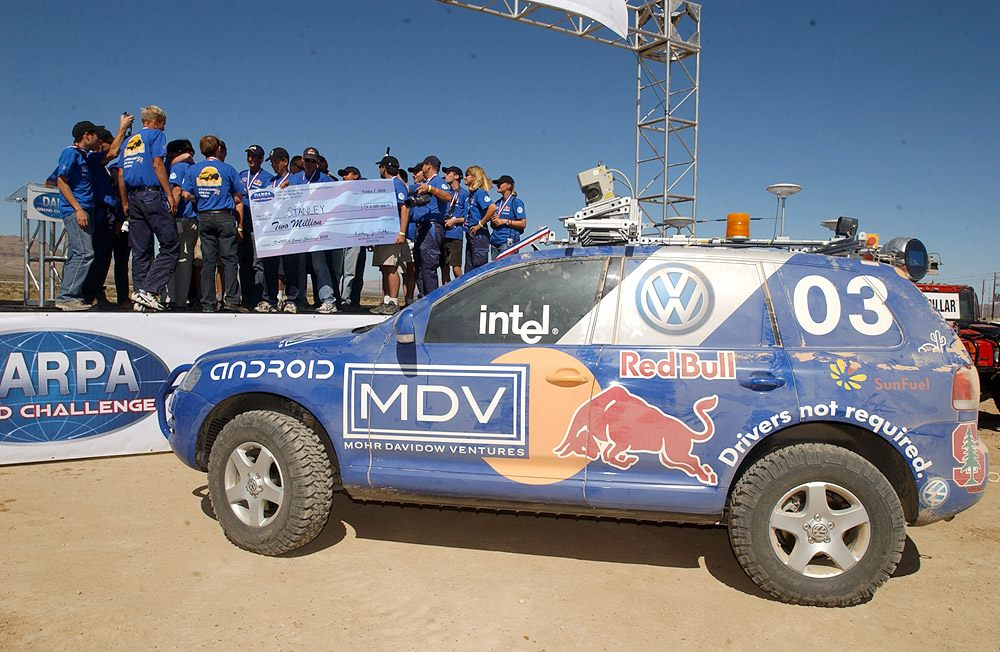
Side view

Led by Sebastian Thrun, during his tenure as an associate professor and director of the Stanford Artificial Intelligence Lab, the Stanford Racing Team was developed solely for the purpose of competing in the 2005 DARPA Grand Challenge. Stanford did not participate in the 2004 DARPA Grand Challenge and was considered to have 20:1 chances of winning the 2005 competition. The car, a modified Volkswagen Touareg crossover SUV, is currently located at the Smithsonian American History Museum. It was displayed at the 2006 New York International Auto Show and two years at the Volkswagen Autostadt Museum (Germany). The Stanford Racing Team entered a new vehicle, a 2006 Volkswagen Passat Wagon, dubbed "Junior", in the 2007 DARPA Urban Challenge. Other key contributors on the team include Michael Montemerlo (software lead), Sven Strohband (lead hardware engineer), David Stavens (roboticist/engineer), Hendrik Dahlkamp (computer vision lead), Cedric Dupont (vehicle lead), and Pamela Mahoney (communications lead).

== Construction ==
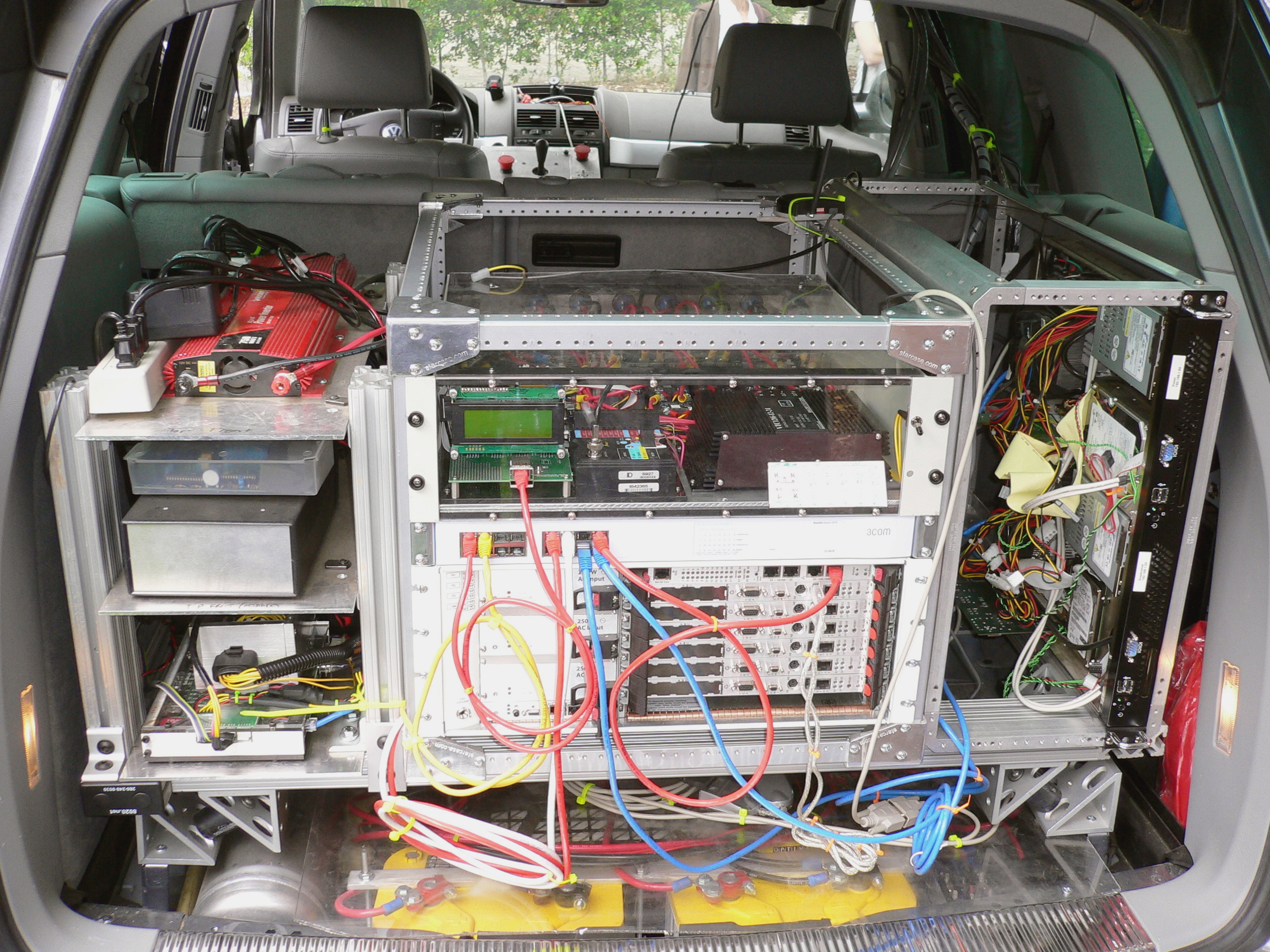
View of the computers in the cargo area of Stanley

The car began as a standard European diesel model Volkswagen Touareg provided by Volkswagen's ERL for the competition. The Stanford Racing Team chose the Touareg for its "drive by wire" control system which could be adapted (and was done so by the ERL) to be run directly from an onboard computer without the use of actuators or servo motors; however, the steering wheel was driven by an electric motor and the gear shifting accomplished with a hydraulic piston).

For navigation, the car was equipped with five roof-mounted Sick AG LIDAR units to build a 3-D map of the environment, thus supplementing the position sensing GPS system. An internal guidance system utilizing gyroscopes and accelerometers monitored the orientation of the vehicle and also served to supplement GPS and other sensor data. Additional guidance data was provided by a video camera used to observe driving conditions out to eighty meters (beyond the range of the LIDAR) and to ensure room enough for acceleration. Stanley also had sensors installed in a wheel well to record a pattern imprinted on the tire and to act as an odometer in case of loss of signal (such as when driving through a tunnel). Using the data from this sensor, the onboard computer can extrapolate how far it has traveled since the signal was lost.

To process the sensor data and execute decisions, the car was equipped with seven low-power 1.6 GHz Intel Pentium M based computers in the trunk, running different versions of the Linux operating system.

== Programming ==
The School of Engineering developed the 100,000 lines of software to interpret sensor data and execute navigation decisions. Using what Popular Mechanics described a "common robot hierarchy", the vehicle utilizes "low-level modules fed raw data from LIDAR, the camera, GPS sets, and inertial sensors into software programs [to control] speed, direction, and decision making.

The vehicle featured a machine learning based approach to obstacle detection. Data from the LIDARs was fused with images from the vision system to perform a distant look-ahead. If a path of drivable terrain could not be detected for at least 40 meters in front of the vehicle, speed was decreased and the LIDARs were used to locate a safe passage.

To correct common errors made by the vehicle early in its development, the Stanford Racing Team created a log of "human reactions and decisions" and fed the data into a learning algorithm tied to the vehicle's controls; this action served to reduce errors. The computer log of humans driving also made the car more accurate in detecting shadows, a problem that had caused many of the vehicle failures in the 2004 DARPA Grand Challenge.

== See also ==
- Simultaneous localization and mapping
