= DARPA Grand Challenge =

Prize competition for American autonomous vehicles

The DARPA Grand Challenge is a prize competition for American autonomous vehicles, funded by the Defense Advanced Research Projects Agency, the most prominent research organization of the United States Department of Defense. Congress has authorized DARPA to award cash prizes to further DARPA's mission to sponsor revolutionary, high-payoff research that bridges the gap between fundamental discoveries and military use. The initial DARPA Grand Challenge in 2004 was created to spur the development of technologies needed to create the first fully autonomous ground vehicles capable of completing a substantial off-road course within a limited time. The third event, the DARPA Urban Challenge in 2007, extended the initial Challenge to autonomous operation in a mock urban environment. The 2012 DARPA Robotics Challenge, focused on autonomous emergency-maintenance robots, and new Challenges are still being conceived. The DARPA Subterranean Challenge was tasked with building robotic teams to autonomously map, navigate, and search subterranean environments. Such teams could be useful in exploring hazardous areas and in search and rescue.

In addition to the challenges in autonomous technology, DARPA has also conducted prize competitions in other areas of technology.

== History and background ==
Fully autonomous vehicles have been an international pursuit for many years, from endeavors in Japan (starting in 1977), Germany (Ernst Dickmanns and VaMP), Italy (the ARGO Project), the European Union (EUREKA Prometheus Project), the United States of America, and other countries. DARPA funded the development of the first fully autonomous robot beginning in 1966 with the Shakey the robot project at Stanford Research Institute, now SRI International. The first autonomous ground vehicle capable of driving on and off roads was developed by DARPA as part of the Strategic Computing Initiative beginning in 1984 leading to demonstrations of autonomous navigation by the Autonomous Land Vehicle and the Navlab.

The Grand Challenge was the first long distance competition for driverless cars in the world; other research efforts in the field of driverless cars take a more traditional commercial or academic approach. The U.S. Congress authorized DARPA to offer prize money ($1 million) for the first Grand Challenge to facilitate robotic development, with the ultimate goal of making one-third of ground military forces autonomous by 2015. Following the 2004 event, Dr. Tony Tether, the director of DARPA, announced that the prize money had been increased to $2 million for the next event, which was claimed on October 9, 2005. The first, second and third places in the 2007 Urban Challenge received $2 million, $1 million, and $500,000, respectively. 14 new teams have qualified in year 2015.

The competition was open to teams and organizations from around the world, as long as there was at least one U.S. citizen on the roster. Teams have participated from high schools, universities, businesses and other organizations. More than 100 teams registered in the first year, bringing a wide variety of technological skills to the race. In the second year, 195 teams from 36 U.S. states and 4 foreign countries entered the race.

== 2004 Grand Challenge ==
The first competition of the DARPA Grand Challenge was held on March 13, 2004 in the Mojave Desert region of the United States, along a 150-mile (240 km) route that follows along the path of Interstate 15 from just before Barstow, California to just past the California–Nevada border in Primm. None of the robot vehicles finished the route. Carnegie Mellon University's Red Team and car Sandstorm (a converted Humvee) traveled the farthest distance, completing 11.78 km (7.32 mi) of the course before getting hung up on a rock after making a switchback turn. No winner was declared, and the cash prize was not given. Therefore, a second DARPA Grand Challenge event was scheduled for 2005.

== 2005 Grand Challenge ==
The second competition of the DARPA Grand Challenge began at 6:40 am on October 8, 2005. All but one of the 23 finalists in the 2005 race surpassed the 11.78 km (7.32 mi) distance completed by the best vehicle in the 2004 race. Five vehicles successfully completed the 212 km (132 mi) course:

Vehicle	Team name	Team home	Time taken (h:m)	Result
Stanley	Stanford Racing Team	Stanford University, Palo Alto, California	6:54	First place
Sandstorm	Red Team	Carnegie Mellon University, Pittsburgh, Pennsylvania	7:05	Second place
H1ghlander	Red Team	Carnegie Mellon University, Pittsburgh, Pennsylvania	7:14	Third place
Kat-5	Team Gray	The Gray Insurance Company, Metairie, Louisiana	7:30	Fourth place
TerraMax	Team TerraMax	Oshkosh Truck Corporation, Oshkosh, Wisconsin	12:51	Over 10-hour limit, fifth place

Vehicles in the 2005 race passed through three narrow tunnels and negotiated more than 100 sharp left and right turns. The race concluded through Beer Bottle Pass, a winding mountain pass with a sheer drop-off on one side and a rock face on the other. Although the 2004 course required more elevation gain and some very sharp switchbacks (Daggett Ridge) were required near the beginning of the route, the course had far fewer curves and generally wider roads than the 2005 course.

The natural rivalry between the teams from Stanford and Carnegie Mellon (Sebastian Thrun, head of the Stanford team was previously a faculty member at Carnegie Mellon and colleague of Red Whittaker, head of the CMU team) was played out during the race. Mechanical problems plagued H1ghlander before it was passed by Stanley. Gray Team's entry was a miracle in itself, as the team from the suburbs of New Orleans was caught in Hurricane Katrina a few short weeks before the race. The fifth finisher, Terramax, a 30,000 pound entry from Oshkosh Truck, finished on the second day. The huge truck spent the night idling on the course, but was particularly nimble in carefully picking its way down the narrow roads of Beer Bottle Pass.

== 2007 Urban Challenge ==
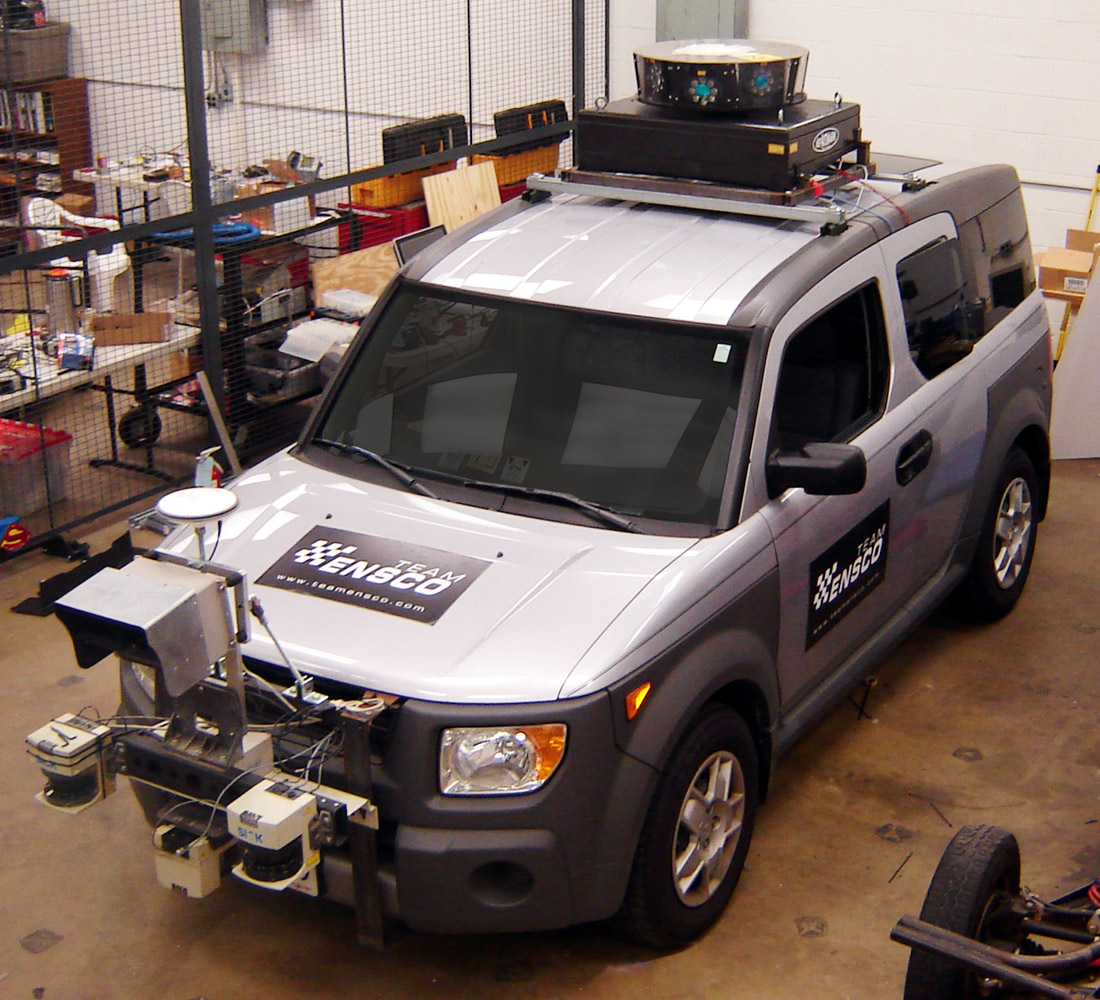
Team Ensco's vehicle that was developed for the 2007 DARPA Urban Challenge

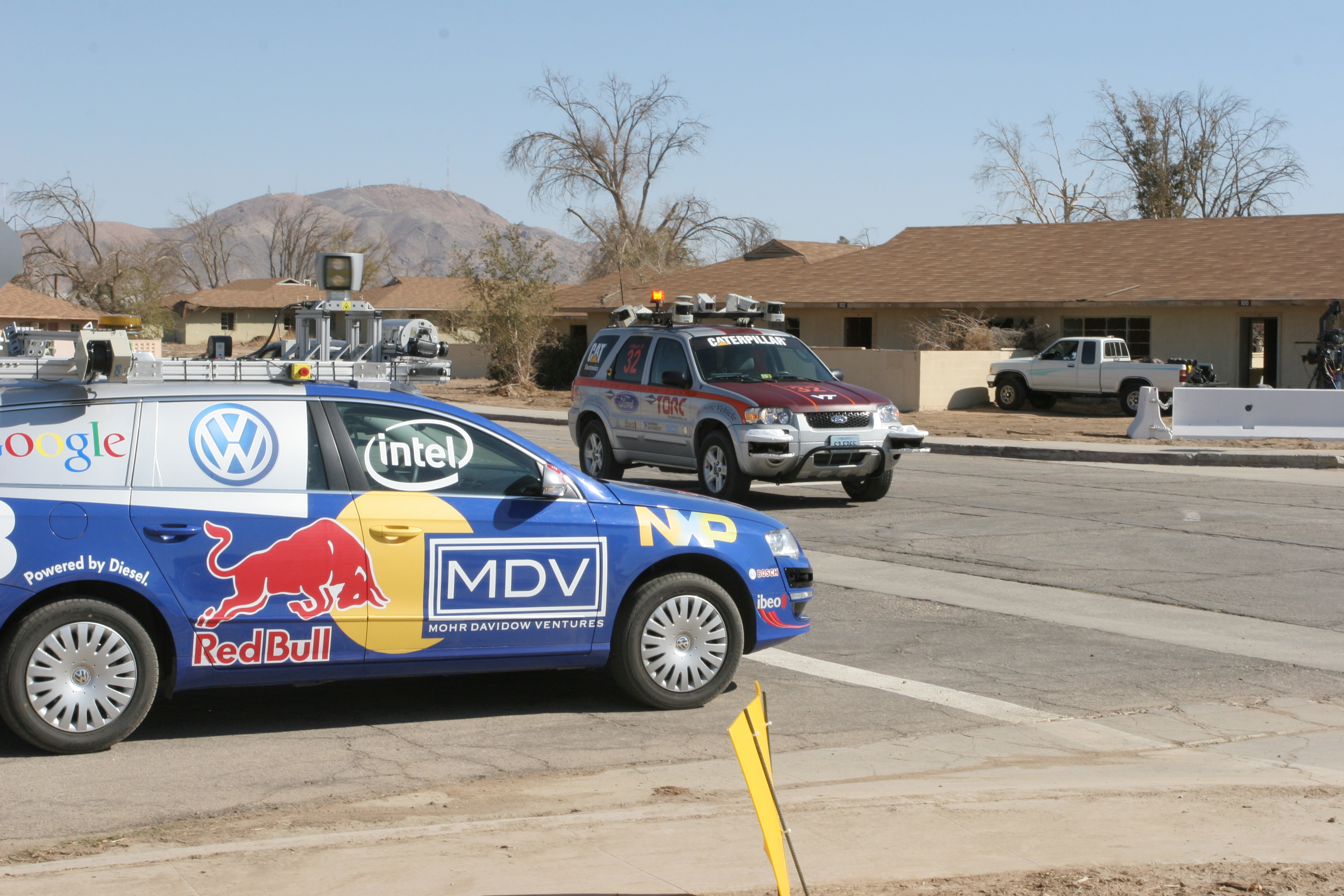
Stanford Racing and Victor Tango together at an intersection in the DARPA Urban Challenge Finals

The third competition of the DARPA Grand Challenge, known as the "Urban Challenge", took place on November 3, 2007 at the site of the now-closed George Air Force Base (currently used as Southern California Logistics Airport), in Victorville, California (Google map). The course involved a 96 km (60 mi) urban area course, to be completed in less than 6 hours. Rules included obeying all traffic regulations while negotiating with other traffic and obstacles and merging into traffic.

Unlike previous challenges, the 2007 Urban Challenge organizers divided competitors into two "tracks", A and B. All Track A and Track B teams were part of the same competition circuit, but the teams chosen for the Track A program received US $1 million in funding. These 11 teams largely represented major universities and large corporate interests such as CMU teaming with GM as Tartan Racing, Stanford teaming with Volkswagen, Virginia Tech teaming with TORC Robotics as VictorTango, Oshkosh Truck, Honeywell, Raytheon, Caltech, Autonomous Solutions, Cornell University, and MIT. One of the few independent entries in Track A was the Golem Group. DARPA has not publicly explained the rationale behind the selection of Track A teams.

Teams were given maps sparsely charting the waypoints that defined the competition courses. At least one team, Tartan Racing, enhanced the maps through the insertion of additional extrapolated waypoints for improved navigation. A debriefing paper published by Team Jefferson illustrates graphically the contrast between the course map it was given by DARPA and the course map used by Tartan Racing.

Tartan Racing claimed the $2 million prize with their vehicle "Boss", a Chevy Tahoe. The second-place finisher earning the $1 million prize was the Stanford Racing Team with their entry "Junior", a 2006 Volkswagen Passat. Coming in third place was team VictorTango, winning the $500,000 prize with their 2005 Ford Escape hybrid, "Odin". MIT placed 4th, with Cornell University and University of Pennsylvania/Lehigh University also completing the course.

The six teams that successfully finished the entire course:

Team name	ID#	Vehicle	Type	Team home	Time taken (h:m:s)	Result
Tartan Racing	19	Boss	2007 Chevy Tahoe	Carnegie Mellon University, Pittsburgh, Pennsylvania	4:10:20	1st Place; averaged approximately 14 mph (22.53 km/h) throughout the course
Stanford Racing	03	Junior	2006 Volkswagen Passat Wagon	Stanford University, Palo Alto, California	4:29:28	2nd Place; averaged about 13.7 mph (22.05 km/h) throughout the course
VictorTango	32	Odin	2005 Ford Hybrid Escape	Virginia Tech, Blacksburg, Virginia	4:36:38	3rd Place; averaged slightly less than 13 mph (20.92 km/h) throughout the course
MIT	79	Talos	Land Rover LR3	MIT, Cambridge, Massachusetts	Approx. 6 hours	4th Place.
The Ben Franklin Racing Team	74	Little Ben	2006 Toyota Prius	University of Pennsylvania, Lehigh University, Philadelphia, Pennsylvania	No official time.	One of 6 teams to finish course
Cornell	26	Skynet	2007 Chevy Tahoe	Cornell University, Ithaca, New York	No official time.	One of 6 teams to finish course

While the 2004 and 2005 events were more physically challenging for the vehicles, the robots operated in isolation and only encountered other vehicles on the course when attempting to pass. The Urban Challenge required designers to build vehicles able to obey all traffic laws while they detect and avoid other robots on the course. This is a particular challenge for vehicle software, as vehicles must make "intelligent" decisions in real time based on the actions of other vehicles. Other than previous autonomous vehicle efforts that focused on structured situations such as highway driving with little interaction between the vehicles, this competition operated in a more cluttered urban environment and required the cars to perform sophisticated interactions with each other, such as maintaining precedence at a 4-way stop intersection.

== 2012 Robotics Challenge ==
The DARPA Robotics Challenge is an ongoing competition focusing on humanoid robotics. The primary goal of the program is to develop ground robotic capabilities to execute complex tasks in dangerous, degraded, human-engineered environments. It launched in October 2012, and hosted the Virtual Robotics Competition in June 2013. Two more competitions are planned: the DRC Trials in December 2013, and the DRC Finals in December 2014.

Unlike prior Challenges, the construction of the "vehicles" will not be part of the scope of the Robotics Challenge. In August 2012 DARPA announced Boston Dynamics would act as sole source for the robots to be used in the challenge, awarding them a contract to develop and build 8 identical robots based on the PETMAN project for the software teams to use. The amount contracted was $10,882,438 cost-plus-fixed-fee contract and work is expected to be completed by Aug. 9, 2014.

== 2013 FANG Challenge ==
On April 22, 2013, DARPA awarded a $1 million prize to "Ground Systems", a 3-person team with members in Ohio, Texas and California, as the winner of the Fast Adaptable Next-Generation Ground Vehicle (FANG) Mobility/Drivetrain Challenge. Team Ground Systems' final design submission received the highest score when measured against the established requirements for system performance and manufacturability. Since the beginning of the first FANG Challenge on January 14, 2013, more than 1,000 participants within more than 200 teams used the META design tools and the VehicleFORGE collaboration platform developed by Vanderbilt University in Nashville, Tennessee, to design and simulate the performance of thousands of potential mobility and drivetrain subsystems. The goal of the FANG program is to test the specially developed META design tools, model libraries and the VehicleFORGE platform, which were created to significantly compress the design-to-production time of a complex defense system.

== 2017–2021 Subterranean Challenge ==
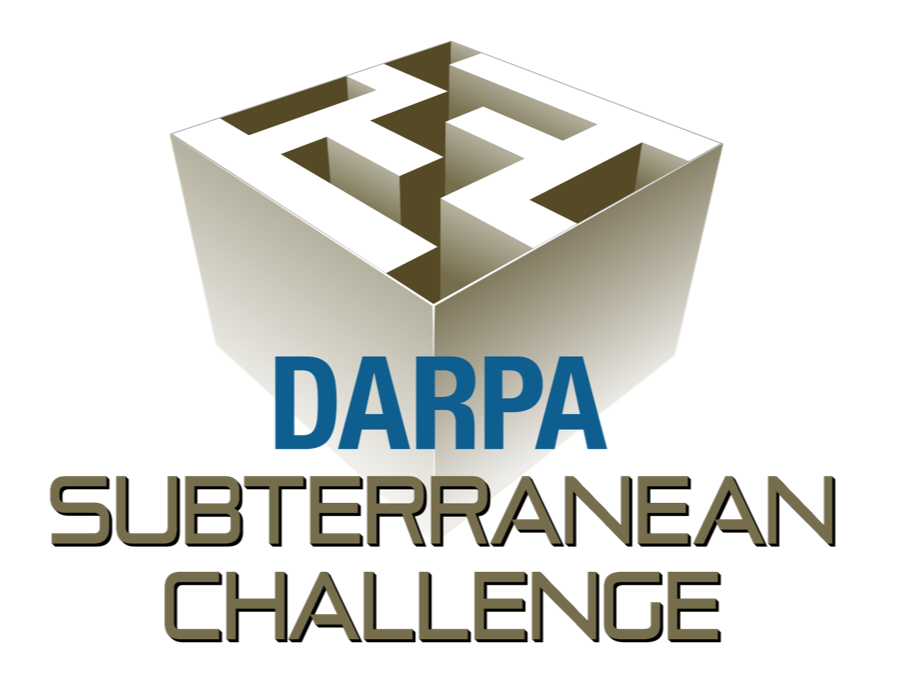
DARPA Subterranean (SubT) Challenge logo

The DARPA Subterranean Challenge tasked teams, consisting of university and corporate entities from around the world, to build robotic systems and virtual solutions to autonomously map, navigate, and search subterranean environments. Such areas can be difficult and dangerous for humans, making robotic teams a desirable option for exploration and search and rescue operations. These environments pose significant challenges to robots as well, including a lack of lighting, dripping water, thick smoke, cluttered or irregularly shaped environments and potential loss of GPS capabilities and communications with their handlers. The Challenge was meant to help close gaps in four technical areas: autonomy, perception, networking and mobility.

The Challenge started in September 2018 and consisted of a Systems Competition (in which teams compete with physical robots) and a Virtual Competition (in which teams compete in a virtual environment in the ROS Gazebo virtual simulator). The competition was split into three stages (Development Stage, Circuit Stage, and Finals Stage. The SubT Challenge consisted of four events, the Tunnel Circuit (August 2019), which was held at an experimental mine in Pittsburgh, PA; the Urban Circuit (February 2020), which featured an abandoned nuclear power plant in Elma, WA; the Cave Circuit (November 2020), which was held virtual only due to the COVID-19 Pandemic; and the Final Event (September 2021), which featured elements from all three domains (tunnel urban underground, and natural cave networks was held in Louisville, KY.

Teams came from 11 countries (Australia, Canada, the Czech Republic, England, Germany, Norway, South Korea, Spain, Sweden, Switzerland, and the United States) and 20 universities. On September 24, 2021, Team CERBERUS won the Final Systems Competition using four ANYmal C legged systems. Australia’s Commonwealth Scientific and Industrial Research Organisation (CSIRO) team came in second to Team CERBERUS, with an equal number of points, but a slightly slower time. Team Dynamo won the Final Virtual Competition.

One important strategy was to build a team of robots with diverse capabilities. With a mix of navigational capabilities such as treads, wheels, rotors and legs, robots were able to navigate a variety of spaces. Different types of robots have different capabilities. Walking robots can deal with uneven terrain such as stairs and piles of rubble. Robots with wheels or treads can carry heavier payloads, including large batteries, and operate for a longer time. “Marsupials” can carry other robots, including small flying robots which have short battery lives. Flying robots can be strategically deployed to map large or difficult-to-access spaces. Using diverse detection instruments, such as lights, radar, sonar and thermal imaging, enables a team of robots and their handlers to gather information about air and visibility conditions and respond to a broader range of conditions.

Because conditions can interfere with communications between robots and their handlers, the teams that developed robots with some degree of autonomy were most successful at the challenge task of mapping and searching a complex subterranean space. Such robots could explore on their own, and then return to radio contact with each other and their handlers to exchange information about what they had found. Australia’s CSIRO team even designed its robots to make cooperative decisions about what tasks to undertake. For example, a robot that was too large to fit into a corridor could notify other robots that it existed, so that a smaller robot could explore there. A robot exploring an area could also for a communications node to be dropped to expand the contact area. A robot deep in a cavern could relay information back to a robot closer to the surface, which could more quickly walk back to a point where it could report the information to the human operators. This changed the way in which humans worked with the robots: the human operator used the control system to set goals and direct overall strategy, leaving the robots to assess on-the-ground conditions and choose how to get the job done.

== 2018 Launch Challenge ==
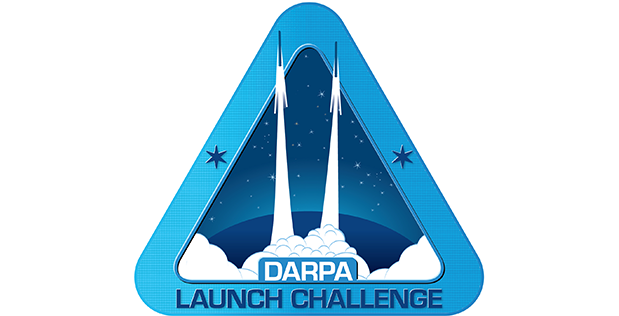

In early 2020, three teams were expected to compete by rapidly launching a small satellite payload into orbit, with minimal notification, from two different launch sites (this requirement was later, when there was only one competitor left in the Challenge, relaxed so that the launches should use different launch pads, but could use the same launch site) – one just days after the other – for an opportunity to win prizes. The prizes of the Challenge are: All teams that qualify for the competition would receive $400,000. Each team to successfully carry out an orbital launch gets a prize of $2 million, and is eligible to try to make a second launch in rapid succession. The second launches of the teams are scored (based on combination of time to launch, mass launched and orbital accuracy, etc.); the winning team gets $10 million, second prize is $9 million, and third prize $8 million. The pool of launch sites for the Challenge originally consisted of 8 launch locations; in the end, only Pacific Spaceport Complex – Alaska was used for an attempted launch.

The Challenge was announced on 18 April 2018, and on 10 April 2019, three finalist teams who would be attempting to launch rockets were announced: Virgin Orbit, Vector Launch and Astra (although at the time it was not published that the third finalist was Astra; the company was referred only as a "stealth startup"). In the autumn of 2019, both Vector and Virgin dropped out of the competition, Vector because of financial problems and Virgin because it wanted to focus on other customers than DARPA. The final remaining team, Astra, attempted to launch their Astra Rocket 3.0 for the Challenge from Pacific Spaceport Complex – Alaska in late February and early March 2020, but several launch attempts were all called off due to weather and technical difficulties. With the only team left in the competition failing to launch their rocket in the time frame set by DARPA, the Challenge was called off 2 March 2020 with no winner of the DARPA Launch Challenge. The $12 million prize pool went unclaimed. No rocket launch was performed by any contender of the DARPA Launch Challenge.

== Technology ==
A technology paper and source code for the computer vision machine learning component of the 2005 Stanford entry has been published.

2007 Urban Challenge teams employed a variety of different software and hardware combinations for interpreting sensor data, planning, and execution. Some examples:

Team	Language(s)	OS	Hardware	Notes
Stanford Racing	C, C++	Linux	Pentium M computers	Stanford released the full source code
Cornell	C, C++, C#	Windows XP	17 dual-core servers	Planning involved Bayesian mathematics. In 2008, Cornell released the full source code under Apache License 2.0.
Insight Racing		Linux	Mac Mini	Mac Minis run on DC power at relatively low power and produce less heat.
Team Case	Mostly LabVIEW, some C++ and MATLAB	Windows XP	5 Mac Minis, 2 NI PXI's, CompactRIO	Mac Minis running on DC power with solid state drives. PXI's for sensor interfaces. CompactRIO for real-time vehicle controller. Biologically-inspired software architecture.
Team Gray			GrayMatter, Inc. AVS.	Embedded hardware system was considerably smaller than that of other teams. Also, the system allows possible expansion with other sensors.
Team LUX		Windows XP		embedded version of XP
Team Jefferson	Java	Solaris (Java RTS), Linux (Java SE)	micro-controllers and Sun SPOT (Java ME)	On Perrone Robotics' MAX robotics platform atop Sun Microsystems' Java RTS/SE/ME.
Team Ben Franklin	MATLAB			
Sting Racing	Java	Linux		
VictorTango	a mixture of C++ and LabVIEW	Windows, Linux		Only finisher implementing JAUS, only finisher not using Velodyne sensor
Team Gator Nation (CIMAR)	C, C++, and C#	Windows, Linux (Fedora)		systems communication with the JAUS protocol.
MIT	C	Linux	cluster with 40 cores	The robotic middleware library Lightweight Communications and Marshaling (LCM) was developed for the MIT vehicle.
Austin Robot Technology	C++			software was written and developed by undergraduates from a UT-Austin course. Used the Player Project as an infrastructure.
Tartan Racing (winner)	C++	Linux		Employed a hierarchical control system, with layered mission planning, motion planning, behavior generation, perception, world modelling, and mechatronics.

== See also ==
- ARPA-E (energy)
- Centennial Challenges
- Driverless car
- Multi Autonomous Ground-robotic International Challenge
- European Land - Robot Trial
- General Motors EN-V
- Global Security Challenge
- Google driverless car
- List of challenge awards
- MIT Media Lab CityCar
- Robot competition
- VisLab Intercontinental Autonomous Challenge
- DARPA Prize Competitions
