= Frank Dellaert =

Belgian roboticist (born 1966)

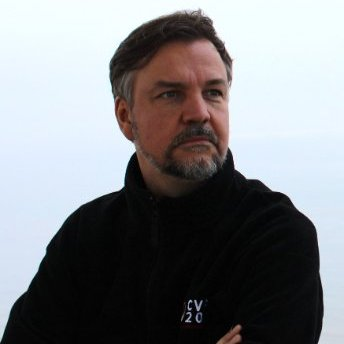
- Born: September 14, 1966 (age 59); Belgium
- Education: Carnegie Mellon University
- Scientific career
- Fields: Robotics and Computer Vision
- Workplaces: Georgia Tech Atlanta; Georgia Institute of Technology
- Doctoral advisor: Sebastian Thrun and Charles Thorpe

Frank Dellaert is a professor in the School of Interactive Computing at the Georgia Institute of Technology. He is also affiliated with the IRIM@GT center and is well known for contributions to Robotics and Computer Vision.

== Early Education ==
Since his first interest in robotics when he was ten, Dellaert has attended the Catholic University of Leuven, in Belgium, from 1984 to 1989 and received an academic engineering degree (Burg. Ir.) in electrical engineering. He attended the Case Western Reserve University from 1993 to 1995 and received a master's degree in computer science and engineering. In 1995 he began studying at Carnegie Mellon University, where he worked as a research assistant and received his Ph.D. in computer science in 2001. In August of that same year, he joined the faculty of Georgia Institute of Technology.

== Research ==
Frank Dellaert holds interests in the areas of robotics and computer vision, including Bayesian inference and Monte Carlo approximations and how to attain efficiency with approximation methods. In 1999, together with his colleagues Dieter Fox, Sebastian Thrun, and Wolfram Burgard, Frank Dellaert helped develop the Monte Carlo localization algorithm, a probabilistic approach to mobile robot localization that is based on the particle filter. His methodologies for estimating and tracking robotic movements have become a standard and popular tool in mobile robotics. Since joining Georgia Tech, he has explored probabilistic model-based reasoning, paired with randomized approximation methods in advanced sequential Monde Carlo methods, Spatio-Temporal Reconstruction from images, and Simultaneous Location and Mapping. While at Tech, he has applied functional programming to robotics research and education, aiming to educate students about how functional languages embody many of the advancements in computer science and how well-suited it can be in that field.

Dellaert's research is also being used in such projects as SWAN, augmented reality research, and 4D Cities. SWAN (System for Wearable Audio Navigation) is a wearable computer system that takes in details about the web and relays certain signals to the user, aimed at assisting the blind or others during low-visibility situations. Dellaert is researching ways to make its awareness system more exact and efficient. The 4D Cities project, developed by Dellaert and Grant Schindler with help from Sing Bing Kang of Microsoft Research, provides a way to look at a 3D model of a city over time. After looking at different images of a city from different points in time, the program is able to build a 3D model of the city for those times.

== Awards ==
Dellaert won a School of Computer Science Student Award during his stay at Carnegie Mellon University.

In 2005 Dellaert received a $90K NSF CAREER award for "Markov Chain Monte Carlo Methods for Large Scale Correspondence Problems in Computer Vision and Robotics."

In 2006, Dellaert was one of 8 Virtual Earth RFP (research for proposal) winners who each received a grant of up to $50,000. As a recipient of the grant, Dellaert will research basic digital geographics that are expected to advance the state of the art, such as the 4-D Cities project.
