= UTN =

UTN or Utn may refer to:

- National Technological University (Spanish: Universidad Tecnológica Nacional), a public university in Argentina
- University of Technology Nuremberg, in Nuremberg, Bavaria, Germany
- University of Tennessee, a public research university in Knoxville, Tennessee, also known as UTenn
- Untrinilium, an unsynthesized chemical element with atomic number 130 and symbol Utn
- United Thai Nation, a far-right, national-conservative and militarist political party in Thailand.
