= Teresa Goines =

American social entrepreneur

- Born: Tucson, Arizona
- Education: Westmont College
- Occupations: Founder and CEO of Old Skool Cafe Youth Run Supper Club
- Website: www.oldskoolcafe.org

Teresa Moore Goines is a social entrepreneur and former juvenile corrections officer who founded the Old Skool Cafe, a nonprofit, youth-run supper club in San Francisco, California.

== Life and education ==
Goines was born in Tucson, Arizona. In 1997 she received a degree in psychology from Westmont College in Santa Barbara, California. Goines then spent two years working as a juvenile corrections officer at Los Prietos Boys Camp. Then, she quit her job and moved to Mexico to learn the language and culture, but she later returned to San Francisco. There, she worked in the Mission District gang prevention program until it lost its funding.

In 2005, Goines founded Cora Jean's Old Skool Cafe, a youth-run supper club and internship program that provides its interns with training in culinary arts, entrepreneurship and conflict resolution. In an interview, she explained that the program aims to provide a second chance to young people with criminal records who are willing to change. The program, which is named after Goines' mother, offers a variety of job opportunities, such as event management, cooking, dishwashing and performing as singers or dancers. The project began as a home cooking class in her apartment in Potrero Hill.

By 2012, it had developed into a brick-and-mortar restaurant located in a former church in San Francisco.

== Awards and honors ==
In 2006 Goines received the San Francisco Foundation Koshland Bayview Fellowship Award and is a listed member of the Koshland Committee.

She was awarded the 2008 Jefferson Award and the 2009 FBI Director's Community Leadership Award for her project Old Skool Cafe.
