= Bennewitz (surname) =

Bennewitz is a German surname. Notable people with the surname include:

- Antonín Bennewitz (1833–1926), Czech violinist, conductor and music teacher
- Diederik Lodewijk Bennewitz (1764–1826), Dutch goldsmith, silversmith and jeweller
- Fritz Bennewitz (1926–1995), German theatre director
- Maren Bennewitz (born 1973), German roboticist
- Peter Bennewitz (1495–1552), birth name of Petrus Apianus, German humanist
- Philipp Bennewitz (1531–1589), birth name of Philipp Apian, German mathematician, doctor, cartographer
- Paul Bennewitz (1927–2003), an American businessman
- Rick Bennewitz (1936–1999), an American television soap opera director
