= Seth A. Hutchinson =

- Education: Purdue University
- Scientific career
- Fields: Robotics; Control theory
- Workplaces: Northeastern University, University of Illinois at Urbana-Champaign, Georgia Institute of Technology
- Doctoral advisor: Avi Kak

Seth A. Hutchinson is an American electrical and computer engineer. He is currently a professor at Northeastern University, jointly appointed in Khoury College of Computer Sciences and Electrical and Computer Engineering, beginning January 2025. Previously, he served as executive director of the Institute for Robotics and Intelligent Machines at Georgia Tech. His research in robotics spans the areas of planning, sensing, and control. He has published widely on these topics, and is coauthor of the books Robot Modeling and Control, published by Wiley, Principles of Robot Motion - Theory, Algorithms, and Implementations, with Howie Choset, Kevin M. Lynch, George Kantor, Wolfram Burgard, Lydia E. Kavraki and Sebastian Thrun.

Hutchinson has served as president of the IEEE Robotics and Automation Society (RAS), member of the RAS Administrative Committee, the editor-in-chief for the IEEE Transactions on Robotics and as the founding editor-in-chief of the RAS Conference editorial board. He is a Fellow of the IEEE.

Hutchinson is an emeritus professor of electrical and computer engineering at the University of Illinois at Urbana-Champaign, where he was professor of ECE until 2018. He received his Ph.D. from Purdue University.
