= Michael Dean Shelton =

American actor, humanitarian

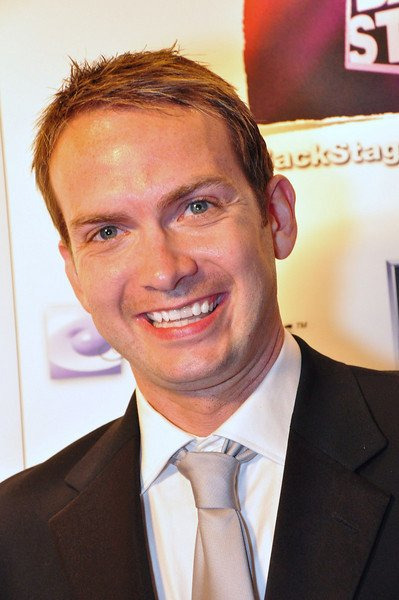
- Shelton Attending The Sudan Hope Fundraiser November 10th 2009
- Born: January 16, 1977 (age 49); Ottawa, Kansas
- Education: California Lutheran University
- Occupation: Actor - Activist - Photographer
- Website: www.michaeldeanshelton.com

Michael Dean Shelton (born January 16, 1977) is an American actor, activist, and photographer. Making his television debut in 2006 on MTV's Punk'd, he appeared in several reality TV shows, PSAs, in addition to his humanitarian work to that focused on global poverty, food insecurity, mental illness, and LGBTQ+ equality. Shelton is also a photographer who divides his time between Little Rock, Arkansas and Los Angeles, California.

== Early life ==
Born in rural Kansas, Michael was adopted by Doris J. Shelton and Gale A. Shelton. He attended Wellsville High School in Wellsville, Kansas graduating in 1995. After high school, he attended both Westmont College in Santa Barbara, California and California Lutheran University, graduating in 2000 with a Bachelor of Science degree in both Political Science and History. Shelton's mother died in 2012 and his father in 2018.

== Career ==
Shelton has spent most of his career in humanitarian and activism work centered around poverty, homelessness, food insecurity, and equality.

Shelton has created a number of projects that have raised awareness and money for charities. Shelton has worked for the Democratic National Committee, President Bill Clinton, Starlight Starbright Children's Foundation, Children's Hospital of Kansas City, and served on the board for the Franklin County Habitat for Humanity.

== Charitable causes ==
In May 2008, Shelton created Snapshots of Hope a project in which celebrity friends and acquaintances such as Snoop Dogg, Fran Drescher, Ringo Starr, and Julie Newmar used cameras donated by CVS to capture their version of hope. The images were then auctioned off to benefit AIDS Research Alliance.

Continuing his long-term commitment to AIDS/HIV activism, Shelton, in October 2009, created a team for AIDS Project Los Angeles to raise awareness and money for those living with HIV/AIDS. He enlisted the help of celebrity friends, such as Kate Linder (The Young and the Restless) and Romi Dames (Hannah Montana), who came out to walk and utilized their fan bases to raise funds.

In December 2009, Shelton created and co-hosted an event to raise money for the Leap Foundation at The Abby West Hollywood.

In May 2010, Shelton served on Liberty Hill's Honorary Host Committee for their annual Upton Sinclair Awards & Dinner.

Shelton served on the host committee for Operation Smile's Annual Smile Gala on September 24, 2010, honoring Harrison Ford, John Stamos and Susan Casden in Los Angeles.

== Awards ==
Shelton has received a number of awards and honors including a Special Congressional Recognition in 1997, Plaques of Appreciation from Heart to Heart International and the City of Ottawa, Kansas. On November 5, 2010, Shelton was honored by Hope 4 Children with their inaugural Shining Star Philanthropist of the Year Award
