= Shirley Mullen =

Canadian academic administrator

Shirley A. Mullen

5th President of Houghton College
- Incumbent
- Assumed office June 1, 2006
- Preceded by: Daniel R. Chamberlain

Personal details
- Born: 1954 (age 71–72) Nova Scotia, Canada
- Education: Houghton University (B.A.); University of Toronto (M.A.); University of Minnesota (Ph.D.); University of Wales (Ph.D.)
- Profession: Professor

Shirley A. Mullen is a Canadian academic administrator who served as the fifth president of Houghton University. She was named president emerita prior to her resignation in April 2021. Prior to becoming president, Mullen was provost at Westmont College in Santa Barbara, California, where she was awarded faculty/staff membership in Omicron Delta Kappa.

During her time as president, she elected to sell Houghton University's satellite campus located in West Seneca, New York, to shift more focus to the Buffalo area.

== Education ==
Mullen earned a Bachelor of Arts degree from Houghton University in 1976, followed by a Master of Arts from the University of Toronto. Mullen then earned two doctorates, one in history from the University of Minnesota and the other in philosophy from the University of Wales.

== Publications ==
- Dissertation, Organized freethought: the religion of unbelief in Victorian England
- Between "Romance" and "True History": Historical Narrative and Truth Telling in a Postmodern Age
- Faith, Learning, and the Teaching of History

Academic offices
Preceded by Daniel R. Chamberlain	President of Houghton University; 2006 – 2021	Succeeded by Wayne D. Lewis, Jr.
