= Daniel R. Chamberlain =

American academic administrator (1932–2024)

4th President of Houghton College
- In office 1976–2006
- Preceded by: Wilbur Dayton
- Succeeded by: Shirley Mullen

Personal details
- Born: August 22, 1932 Mexico, Missouri, U.S.
- Died: May 31, 2024 (aged 91) Ocean Springs, Mississippi, U.S.
- Education: Upland College; California State University, Los Angeles; University of California, Los Angeles; University of Southern California
- Profession: Academic administrator

Daniel Robert Chamberlain (August 22, 1932 – May 31, 2024) was an American academic administrator who served as president of Houghton College for 30 years.

== Life and career ==
Daniel Robert Chamberlain was born in Mexico, Missouri, on August 22, 1932. He earned a B.A. from Upland College in 1953, followed by a M.A. from California State University, Los Angeles. Chamberlain then earned two doctorates, one from University of California, Los Angeles and the other from University of Southern California.

On February 14, 2005, Chamberlain announced his retirement, effective May 2006. He was succeeded by Shirley Mullen. At the time of his retirement he was one of the longest-serving college presidents in the United States.

Chamberlain died in Ocean Springs, Mississippi, on May 31, 2024, at the age of 91.

== Experience ==
- Western Pilgrim College, 1953–59,

Teacher of English & History, Academic Dean

- Pasadena City Schools, 1959–63,

Teacher of English & History, Co-Director, Experimental Team Teaching Project

- Upland College, 1963–65,

Chairman, Division of Professional Studies, Teacher of English, Acting President

- State University of New York, 1965–68,

Assistant University Dean for University-Wide Activities

- Messiah College, 1968–76,

Dean of the College

- Houghton College, 1976–2006,

President

Academic offices
Preceded by Wilber Dayton	President of Houghton College; 1976 – 2006	Succeeded by Shirley Mullen
