= Jürgen Sturm =

German software engineer

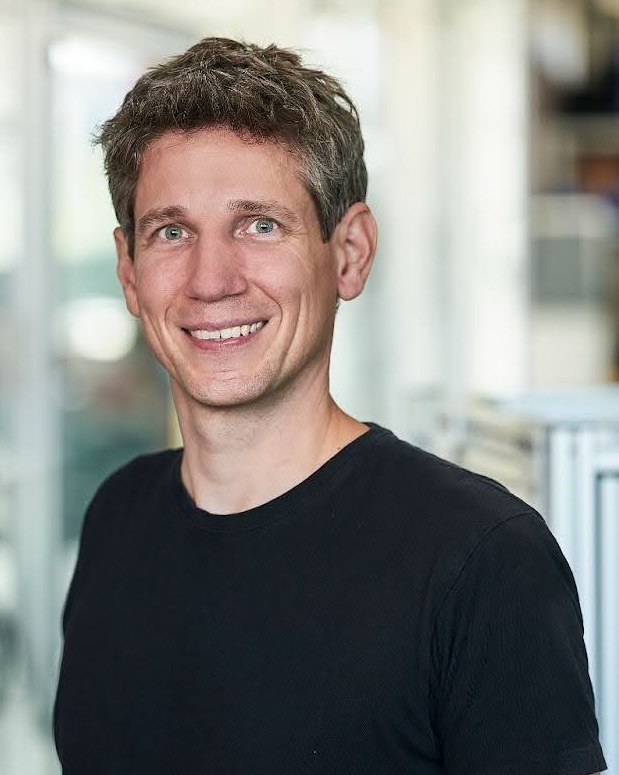
- Education: BS & MS in Artificial Intelligence from University of Amsterdam; PhD., Robotics from University of Freiburg; Postdoc., Computer Vision from Technical University of Munich
- Occupations: Software engineer, entrepreneur and academic
- Engineering career
- Institutions: FabliTec; Metaio (acquired by Apple); Google; Intrinsic
- Website: https://jsturm.de/

Jürgen Sturm is a German software engineer, entrepreneur and academic. He is a Senior Staff Software Engineer at Google, where he works on bringing 3D reconstruction and semantic scene understanding to mixed reality devices.

Sturm is most known for his work on robotics, computer vision, machine learning and artificial intelligence. He has authored and co-authored research articles and a book entitled Approaches to Probabilistic Model Learning for Mobile Manipulation Robots. He is the recipient of the 2011 European Coordinating Committee of Artificial Intelligence (ECCAI) Best Dissertation Award, the 2011 Wolfgang-Gentner Award for an Outstanding PhD Thesis, the TeachInf Best Lecture Award from the Technical University of Munich in 2012 and 2013 for his course Visual Navigation for Flying Robots, and is listed among the most influential robotics scholars in 2022 by Technical University of Munich by AMiner.

== Education and early career ==
Sturm earned his bachelor's and master's degrees in Artificial Intelligence from the University of Amsterdam in 2006, followed by a PhD in Robotics from the University of Freiburg, with his later thesis published as a book in 2013. From 2011 to 2014, he served as a Postdoctoral Researcher in the Computer Vision group at the Technical University of Munich (TUM), where he worked on real-time camera tracking and 3D person scanning methods. Concurrently, he began his academic career, delivering lectures at TUM and teaching an online course at EdX in 2012 and 2013.

== Career ==
At TUM, Sturm developed a 3D reconstruction algorithm enabling 3D scanning of a person for printing as a small figure, leading to him co-founding the 3D scanning startup FabliTec in 2013, where he served as CEO until 2015. In 2014, he joined Metaio as a Senior Software Developer and Team Lead. Subsequently, he was appointed Senior Software Engineer and Tech Lead Manager at Google. leading to multiple patents. He assumed the position of an Engineering Manager at Intrinsic in 2019.

== Research ==
Sturm has contributed to the field of engineering by studying robotics, machine intelligence and machine perception, holding several patents for his developments in RGB-D cameras and 3D mapping techniques.

=== RGB-D SLAM ===
Sturm has researched and worked on RGB-D cameras throughout his career. In a collaborative effort, he presented a benchmark for RGB-D SLAM systems, offering high-quality image sequences with accurate ground truth camera poses, diverse scenes, and automatic evaluation tools accessible through a dedicated website. He also proposed a dense visual SLAM method for RGB-D cameras, alongside Daniel Cremers and Wolfram Burgard, improving pose accuracy by minimizing errors. Additionally, he showcased an RGB-D camera SLAM system for the Microsoft Kinect, assessing its accuracy, robustness, and speed across different indoor scenarios and offering it as open-source software.

=== 3D mapping ===
Sturm's work on 3D mapping focused on reconstruction and improving techniques for precision. Alongside colleagues, he demonstrated a mapping system using RGB-D cameras for accurate 3-D mapping. He also introduced a real-time mapping system for RGB-D images using an octree structure to update a textured triangle mesh, enabling efficient memory usage for mobile or flying robots, as well as a new real-time visual odometry method for monocular cameras, achieving superior accuracy and speed by continuously estimating a semi-dense inverse depth map. Furthermore, he presented a 3D reconstruction algorithm based on Truncated Signed Distance Functions (TSDF), addressing the challenge of representing dynamic environments for robots, with a focus on continuous refinement of static maps and robust scene differencing.

In a joint research effort, Sturm proposed a graph-based method to calibrate sensor suites for accurate direct georeferencing of images from small unmanned aerial systems, addressing static offsets and in-flight calibration of intrinsic camera parameters.

=== 3D perception ===
Sturm has been involved in the development of models for 3D perception and scanning as well. He presented ScanComplete, a data-driven method using a generative 3D CNN model to predict complete 3D models with semantic labels from incomplete scans. In addition, he revealed a real-time RGB-D scene understanding method for mobile devices, combining incremental reconstruction, geometric segmentation, and semantic labeling.

== Awards and honors ==
- 2011 – Best Dissertation Award, European Coordinating Committee of Artificial Intelligence (ECCAI)
- 2011 – Wolfgang-Gentner-Award for an Outstanding PhD Thesis, University of Freiburg
- 2012 – Best Research Paper Award, Unmanned Aerial Vehicle in Geomatics
- 2012, 2013 – TeachInf Best Lecture Award, Technical University of Munich
- 2022 – Most Influential Robotics Scholar

== Bibliography ==
=== Books ===
- Approaches to Probabilistic Model Learning for Mobile Manipulation Robots (2013) ISBN 978-3642371592

=== Selected articles ===
- Endres, F., Hess, J., Engelhard, N., Sturm, J., Cremers, D., & Burgard, W. (2012, May). An evaluation of the RGB-D SLAM system. In 2012 IEEE international conference on robotics and automation (pp. 1691-1696). IEEE.
- Sturm, J., Engelhard, N., Endres, F., Burgard, W., & Cremers, D. (2012, October). A benchmark for the evaluation of RGB-D SLAM systems. In 2012 IEEE/RSJ international conference on intelligent robots and systems (pp. 573-580). IEEE.
- Kerl, C., Sturm, J., & Cremers, D. (2013, November). Dense visual SLAM for RGB-D cameras. In 2013 IEEE/RSJ International Conference on Intelligent Robots and Systems (pp. 2100-2106). IEEE.
- Rethage, D., Wald, J., Sturm, J., Navab, N., & Tombari, F. (2018). Fully-convolutional point networks for large-scale point clouds. In Proceedings of the European Conference on Computer Vision (ECCV) (pp. 596-611).
- Dai, A., Ritchie, D., Bokeloh, M., Reed, S., Sturm, J., & Nießner, M. (2018). Scancomplete: Large-scale scene completion and semantic segmentation for 3d scans. In Proceedings of the IEEE Conference on Computer Vision and Pattern Recognition (pp. 4578-4587).
