= Wolfram Burgard =

German roboticist

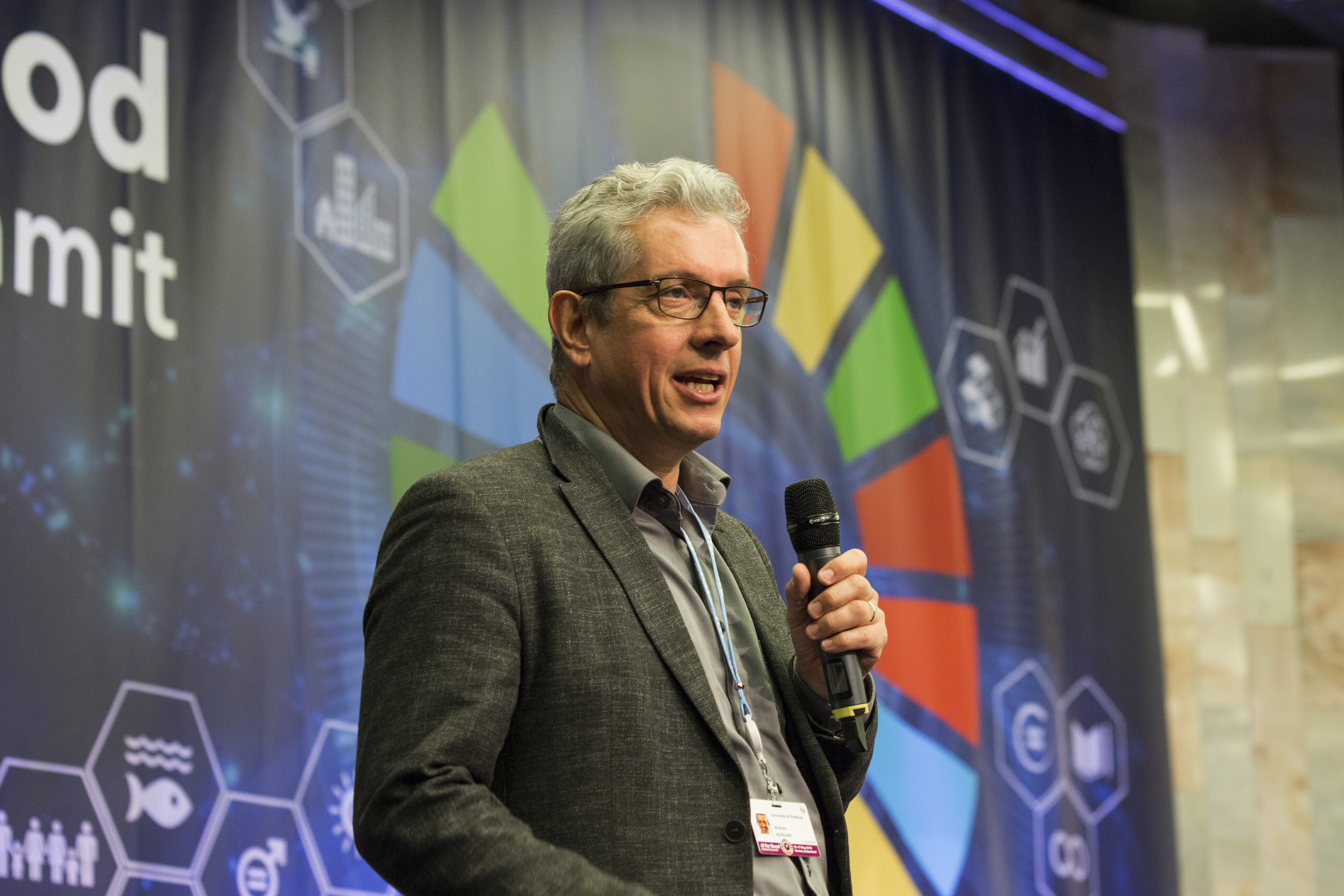
- Wolfram Burgard, Professor of Computer Science, University of Technology Nuremberg speaking at the AI for Good Global Summit 2018 15–17 May 2018, Geneva
- Born: 1961 (age 64–65); Gelsenkirchen, Germany
- Education: University of Bonn; Technical University of Dortmund
- Scientific career
- Fields: Robotics
- Workplaces: University of Technology Nuremberg
- Doctoral advisor: Armin B. Cremers
- Doctoral students: Maren Bennewitz

Wolfram Burgard (born 1961 in Gelsenkirchen, Germany) is a German roboticist. He is a full professor at the University of Technology Nuremberg where he heads the Laboratory for Robotics and Artificial Intelligence. He is known for his substantial contributions to the simultaneous localization and mapping (SLAM) problem as well as diverse other contributions to robotics.

== Biography ==
=== Education ===
Wolfram Burgard received his Diploma degree from University of Dortmund in 1987 and his Doctorate from the University of Bonn in 1991. His thesis advisor was Armin B. Cremers.

=== Career ===
In 1991 he became a research assistant at the University of Bonn, where he led the laboratory for Autonomous Mobile Systems. He was head of the research group that installed the mobile robot Rhino as the first interactive museum tour-guide robot in the Deutsches Museum Bonn, Germany in 1997. In 1998, he and his colleagues deployed the mobile robot Minerva in the National Museum of American History in Washington DC. In 1999, Wolfram Burgard became Professor for Autonomous Intelligent Systems at the Albert-Ludwigs-Universität Freiburg. In 2022, he became Professor for Robotics and Artificial Intelligence as well as Founding Chair of the Department Engineering of the University of Technology Nuremberg.

=== Research ===
Together with his colleagues, Wolfram Burgard developed numerous probabilistic approaches to mobile robot navigation. This includes Markov localization, a probabilistic approach to mobile localization that can robustly track the position of a mobile robot, estimate its global position when it starts without any prior knowledge about it, and even recover from localization failures. In 1999, Frank Dellaert, Dieter Fox, Sebastian Thrun, and Wolfram Burgard developed Monte Carlo localization, a probabilistic approach to mobile robot localization that is based on particle filters.

Wolfram Burgard and his group have also made substantial contributions to the simultaneous localization and mapping (SLAM) problem, which is to determine the map of the environment and the position of the robot at the same time.

Wolfram Burgard together with his long-term collaborators Dieter Fox and Sebastian Thrun is a co-author of the book Probabilistic Robotics. He also is a co-author of the book Principles of Robot Motion - Theory, Algorithms, and Implementations, together with Howie Choset, Kevin M. Lynch, Seth A. Hutchinson, George Kantor, Lydia E. Kavraki and Sebastian Thrun.

Wolfram Burgard has the 2009 Gottfried Wilhelm Leibniz Prize, the most prestigious German research prize. He has furthermore received seven best paper awards from outstanding conferences. He also became a distinguished lecturer of the IEEE Robotics and Automation Society.

In 2008, Wolfram Burgard became a fellow of the European Coordinating Committee for Artificial Intelligence. In 2009, Wolfram Burgard became a fellow of the Association for the Advancement of Artificial Intelligence. In 2010, he received an Advanced Grant from the European Research Council.

=== Students ===
Wolfram Burgard supervised several PhD students in his lab for Autonomous Intelligent Systems, namely Maren Bennewitz (2004), Dirk Haehnel (2005), Cyrill Stachniss (2006), Rudolph Triebel (2007), Óscar Martínez Mozos (2008), Patrick Pfaff (2008), and Christian Plagemann (2008), Jürgen Sturm (2011), Daniel Meyer-Delius Di Vasto (2011), Slawomir Grzonka (2011), Thilo Grundmann (2012), Kai Wurm (2012), Axel Rottmann (2012), Barbara Frank (2013), Rainer Kümmerle (2013), Bastian Steder (2013), Jörg Müller (2013), Dominik Joho (2013), Boris Lau (2013), Maximilian Beinhofer (2014).

A large fraction of his publications are available at Google Scholar.
