= Willard J. Houghton =

Willard J. Houghton (1825–1896) was a Protestant clergyman who founded Houghton College in Houghton, New York.

Houghton was born on July 19, 1825, to a family of English ancestry. Houghton married on January 10, 1847, to Harriet Wilson (born 1827) and they had two sons. Houghton was a farmer until middle-age when he became a clergyman. He had studied extensively while farming, and in 1876 he left farming to purchase a house in the village of Houghton and to focus exclusively on Christian ministry. In 1877 he led the effort to building a church meeting house in the village where he eventually ran a Sunday school. In 1883 Houghton founded the Houghton Seminary on part of his old homestead, and helped to subsidize the educations of various men in the school who became ministers. Houghton was not ordained as a Wesleyan Church preacher until late in life, but mainly worked as a lay minister throughout his life. Houghton died of a stroke on April 21, 1896, after a busy Sunday of preaching and teaching.
