= Donald J. Patterson =

American academic

- Born: April 11, 1972 (age 54); Rhode Island, United States
- Education: Cornell University (BS, MEng), University of Washington (MS, PhD)
- Known for: Ubiquitous computing Artificial intelligence Human-computer interaction
- Awards: National Defense Science and Engineering Graduate Fellowship
- Scientific career
- Fields: Computer science, informatics
- Workplaces: Westmont College
- Doctoral advisor: Henry Kautz, Dieter Fox

Donald J. Patterson (born April 11, 1972) is the Vice President of Artificial Intelligence and Machine learning at LedgerLink.ai . He is an expert on topics including cryptocurrency, health technology, and technology in the context of civilizational collapse.

== Education ==
Dr. Patterson earned bachelor's and master's degrees from Cornell University before spending four years in Japan and Sardinia as a naval operations officer. He earned a doctorate in computer science from the University of Washington and has been recognised for his work on collapse informatics and abstract object usage.

== Research & Career ==
Based on his research, he co-founded more than five startup companies including the American cryptocurrency financial compliance corporation, Blockpliance. He previously worked as a professor of computer science at Westmont College in Santa Barbara, California and the University of California, Irvine Donald Bren School of Information and Computer Sciences, where he earned tenure and served as director of the Laboratory for Ubiquitous Computing and Interaction.

== Most cited articles ==
- Kestenbaum B, Sampson JN, Rudser KD, Patterson DJ, Seliger SL, Young B, Sherrard DJ, and Andress DL. Serum phosphate levels and mortality risk among people with chronic kidney disease. Journal of the American Society of Nephrology, 16:520–528, 2005.
- Philipose M, Fishkin KP, Perkowitz M, Patterson DJ, Fox D, Kautz H, Hahnel D. Inferring activities from interactions with objects. IEEE pervasive computing. 2004 Oct;3(4):50-7.
- Liao L, Patterson DJ, Fox D, Kautz H. Learning and inferring transportation routines. Artificial intelligence. 2007 Apr 1;171(5–6):311-31.
- Patterson DJ, Liao L, Fox D, Kautz H. Inferring high-level behavior from low-level sensors. InInternational Conference on Ubiquitous Computing 2003 Oct 12 (pp. 73–89). Springer, Berlin, Heidelberg.
- Patterson DJ, Fox D, Kautz H, Philipose M. Fine-grained activity recognition by aggregating abstract object usage. In Ninth IEEE International Symposium on Wearable Computers (ISWC'05) 2005 Oct 18 (pp. 44–51).
