= Robert Beckford =

British academic theologian (born 1965)

Prof. Robert Beckford
- Born: 1965 (age 60–61); Northampton, England
- Education: Houghton College; London School of Theology; University of Birmingham (UK)
- Occupations: Academic and broadcaster
- Employer: University of Winchester
- Known for: Scholar activism, broadcasting, theological studies

Robert Beckford (born 1965) is a British academic theologian and currently Professor and Head of the department of Social Science and Humanities at the University of Wolverhampton with associate roles as a Professor of Black Theology at The Queen's Foundation and as a Professor of Theology at VU University, Amsterdam. His documentaries for both the BBC and Channel 4 have caused debate among the religious community, instigated policy change and won national and international awards.

== Biography ==
=== Early years and education ===
Beckford was born to Jamaican parents in Northampton, in the East Midlands of England, and was raised in an African-Caribbean diaspora church. He states that his "white, middle-class" religious education teacher "turned me on in a big way to RE and sowed the seeds to think critically about religion and culture", while his maths tutor introduced him to theo-politics-political theology and activism of Malcolm X.

After taking A-levels, Beckford studied religion and sociology at Houghton College, New York. He then studied for an MA degree in Biblical Hermeneutics at the London School of Theology, Middlesex. After a year in community education, he studied for his PhD at the University of Birmingham (UK) while also working part-time at The Queen's Foundation, Birmingham, where he became Britain's first tutor in black theology.

=== Career ===
Professionally, Beckford is a activist scholar, working in both higher education and social justice campaigns in the UK and abroad. He has spent his career in academia, beginning in 1999 as a research fellow at Birmingham University, then becoming a lecturer in African Diaspora Religions & Cultures. For two years, he was Reader in Black theology and Popular Culture at Oxford Brookes University and then a visiting Professor of Sociology at Goldsmiths, University of London. In 2014, he became the first Professor of Black Theology at a UK institution while working at Canterbury Christ Church University. Since May 2021, Beckford has been Professor of Climate and Social Justice at the University of Winchester, with associate roles as a Professor of Black Theology at the Queen's Foundation in Birmingham and Professor of Theology at Vu University in Amsterdam.

In addition to writing monographs, Beckford has presented more than 20 television documentaries, a dozen BBC radio documentaries, co-written BBC Radio dramas and written and produced a decolonial contemporary gospel music album. He has also worked as a BBC Radio presenter for BBC Radio WM.

== Documentaries (TV) ==
=== Britain's Slave Past ===
In 1999, Beckford participated in the first ever three-part Channel 4 documentary series on the history of slavery in the Caribbean and Britain. The series was produced by Sir Trevor Phillips.

=== Blood and Fire: The Story of Jamaican Independence ===
In 2001, Beckford made his debut as a presenter for the BBC. Blood and Fire tells a 30-year story of Jamaican Independence.

=== Test of Time ===
In 2001, Beckford presented a six-part BBC Religious Education series. Each programme explores how the hardest teachings of Jesus are played out in diverse global contexts. The Series won an Education BAFTA.

=== The British Empire Museum ===
In 2003, Beckford presented a BBC 4 television documentary on the Britain's first dedicated colonial museum in Bristol, UK.

=== God is Black ===
In 2004, Beckford presented a documentary called God is Black, which broadcast on Channel 4, which compared white and black people's interpretation of Christianity. It was strongly criticized by conservative evangelicals in the Anglican Church who accused it of "racialising" religious issues.

=== Who Wrote the Bible? ===
In 2004, Beckford hosted a documentary called Who Wrote the Bible? broadcast on Channel 4 on Christmas Day. The documentary explores questions surrounding the authorship of the biblical texts, exploring the impact that those understandings have on the course of politics. Special attention is given to the impact of these understandings on American politics and on ongoing political and religious tensions in the Middle East.

=== Empire Pays Back ===
In 2005, presented a Channel 4 documentary calculating the financial reparations owed to the English-speaking Caribbean for its role in the trans-Atlantic chattel slave trade.

=== Gospel Truth ===
In 2005, Beckford explores the similarities between Scottish psalm singing and African-American gospel music in this Channel 4 documentary.

=== Faith and the Fury: Cinema and Religion ===
In this 2005 two-hour Channel 4 documentary, Beckford examines the interplay of religion and film production in Hollywood.

=== Ghetto Britain ===
In 2006, Beckford made the film Ghetto Britain for the television station More 4. Through the course of the documentary, he composes a manifesto of change that he plans to put before the Commission for Racial Equality. Beckford has also made films for the BBC analysing religion and Britain's colonial history, focusing on the role of Britain's African Caribbean community.

=== The Passion: Films, Faith and Fury ===
On 15 April 2006, Beckford hosted his second one-off documentary, called The Passion: Films, Faith and Fury on Channel 4. This was Beckford's exploration of the history and the increasingly uneasy relationship between religion and the film industry, as well as the controversy that often arises as a result of any major religiously themed film being released.

=== The Real Patron Saints ===
In this 2006 Channel 4 documentary, Beckford explores the hidden, multi-cultural and inclusive histories of some of Britain's patron saints.

=== God Gave Rock and Roll to You ===
In this 2006 Channel 4 documentary, Beckford explores the interplay of music and faith in America and Britain.

=== The Secret Family of Jesus ===
Beckford hosted a documentary called The Secret Family of Jesus on Channel 4 on Christmas Day 2006. In this documentary, he explores the history and legacy of Jesus' family and presents historical evidence of Jesus' familial relationship to John the Baptist; his family unit consisting of four brothers and (at least) two sisters; his relationship with Mary Magdalene; and of Jesus' ministry being passed to his eldest brother James for the approximately 30 years prior to the destruction of the second temple and the subsequent diaspora.

=== The Hidden Story of Jesus ===
On 2007 Christmas Day, Beckford's documentary The Hidden Story of Jesus premiered on Channel 4. It investigates the parallels between Christianity and other religions, some of which predate it.

=== Hidden Jerusalem ===
In his first film for Discovery USA, Beckford goes below the surface of modern Jerusalem in search of evidence of Biblical narratives (2008).

=== The Secrets of the Twelve Disciples ===
In The Secrets of the Twelve Disciples, broadcast in Easter 2008, Beckford explored Paul the Apostle's role in founding the Church and his relationship with Jesus' family; the Roman Catholic Church's claim to Saint Peter; Thomas the Apostle's travels to India; James, son of Zebedee as a patron saint of Spain; the demonisation of Judas Iscariot; and female Apostles.

=== The Dark Ages: The History of Christianity ===
As part of this Channel 4 series in 2009, Beckford explores the hidden multicultural themes and issues in the Dark Ages.

=== The Nativity Decoded ===
On Christmas Day 2008, Beckford's documentary The Nativity Decoded premiered on Channel 4. It provides an in-depth look at the nativity story, its traditions, history and meaning.

=== Revelation: The Bible, A History ===
As part of this 2010 Channel 4 series, Beckford presents a postcolonial interpretation of the Book of Revelation.

=== God Bless You Barack Obama? ===
In this 2010 BBC2 documentary Beckford examines the personal religious history of president Barack Obama.

=== The Seven Wonders of Brazil ===
In this 2014 BBC2 special, Beckford explores the diverse religious traditions of Brazil and how they are all represented in the famous Rio Carnival.

=== The Battle For Christianity ===
In 2016, Beckford presented a programme on The Battle For Christianity, which explored the various ways used to help people accept Christianity including the evangelising of immigrants to the country.

== Independent films ==
=== Swords into Ploughshares: Serious Youth Violence, Austerity and the Church ===
In this 2020 research film Beckford considers the Church's response to serious youth violence Britain and the impact of government austerity.

=== After the Flood: The Church, Slavery and Reconciliation ===
In this 2021 film about the church and slavery, Beckford explores how British Christians legitimated the slave trade, gained from it and how in the present they can atone for this crime.

== Documentaries (radio) ==
=== 2023: Windrush: A Family Divided, BBC Radio 4 ===
Beckford explores the pros and cons of the Windrush/post Windrush experience in this 4-part series.

=== 2023: Barbara Blake-Hannah and Rastafari, BBC World Service ===
A celebration of the life of the Jamaican Rastafari broadcaster and writer, Barbara Blake-Hannah.

=== 2020: Black Jesus: 50th Anniversary of James Cone, BBC World Service ===
Examination of the critical thought and contribution to theological studies of professor James H. Cone.

=== 2020: Will God Save Me: Covid and Black Churches, BBC World Service ===
Exploration of the Black Church's theological response to the COVID-19 pandemic.

=== 2017: Jamaican Bible Remixed, BBC World Service ===
Discussion of the Jamaican New Testament Vision of the Christian Scriptures and its implications for Jamaican Christianity.

=== 2014: The Divinity of Haile Selassie, BBC World Service ===
A short history of Haile Selassie's exile in the UK.

=== 2016: Doping, Diving and God, BBC World Service ===
Examination of the role of faith in sport in the UK and North America.

=== 2010: God on the Internet, BBC Radio 2 ===
Examination of faith groups finding a home on the internet and the implications for traditional places of worship.

=== 2006: Maroon Rebels, BBC Radio 3 ===
Story of the Jamaican Maroons (colonial freedom fighters) and the implications for contemporary resistance in Britain and Jamaica.

=== 2006: The Story of The Voice Newspaper, BBC Radio 2 ===
The story of Britain's best black newspaper.

=== 2005: Jamaican Sound Clash, BBC Radio 2 ===
A cultural history of Jamaican sound systems in Britain.

== Independent radio productions ==
=== 2020: Better Must Come! Black Pentecostals, the Pandemic and the future of Christianity ===
Black Pentecostal, political and medical perspectives on the COVID-19 pandemic in the UK.

== Radio dramas ==
=== 2017: Jesus Piece, BBC Regions ===
A four-part mini-series about a black Pentecostal minister who becomes a detective.

=== 2012: Father, Son and Holy Ghost, BBC Radio 3 ===
The story of a church struggling to come to terms with the social justice needs of the black community.

== Studio-produced album ==
=== 2017: Jamaican Bible Remix (5am Records) ===
A decolonial contemporary gospel music album.

== Bibliography ==
- Jesus is Dread: Black Theology and Black Culture in Britain. Darton, Longman and Todd. 1998. ISBN 978-0232522419.
- Dread and Pentecostal: A Political Theology for the Black Church in Britain. SPCK. 2000. ISBN 978-1610975131.
- God of the Rhatid: Redeeming Rage. Darton, Longman and Todd. 2003. ISBN 978-0232523317.
- God and the Gangs: An Urban Toolkit for Those Who Won't Be Bought Out, Sold Out or Scared Out. Darton, Longman and Todd. 2004. ISBN 978-0232525182.
- Jesus Dub: Theology, Music and Social Change. Routledge. 2006. ISBN 978-0415310192.
- Documentary as Exorcism: Resisting the Bewitchment of Colonial Christianity. Bloomsbury. 2014. ISBN 978-1847063922.
- Duppy Conqueror: My Theology. DLT. 2021
- Decolonising Contemporary Gospel Music Through Praxis: Handsworth Revolutions. Bloomsbury 2023.
