= Westmont College =

Christian college in Montecito, California, US

- Former names: Bible Missionary Institute (1937–1939); Western Bible College (1939–1940)
- Motto: Christus Primatum Tenens (Latin)
- Motto in English: Christ Holding Preeminence
- Type: Private liberal arts college
- Established: October 29, 1937; 88 years ago
- Accreditation: WSCUC
- Religious affiliation: Christian
- Academic affiliations: Christian College Consortium
- Endowment: $92.16 million (2024)
- President: Gayle Beebe
- Provost: Kimberly Battle-Walters Denu
- Faculty: 96
- Administrative staff: 306
- Students: 1,171 (2024)
- Location: Montecito, California, United States; 34.4497888°N 119.6593305°W
- Campus: Suburban, 111 acres (45 ha)
- Colors: (Maroon, grey, & gold)
- Nickname: Warriors
- Sporting affiliations: NCAA Division II – PacWest
- Mascot: Warrior
- Website: westmont.edu

Westmont College is a private Christian liberal arts college in Montecito, California, United States. It was founded in 1937.

== History ==
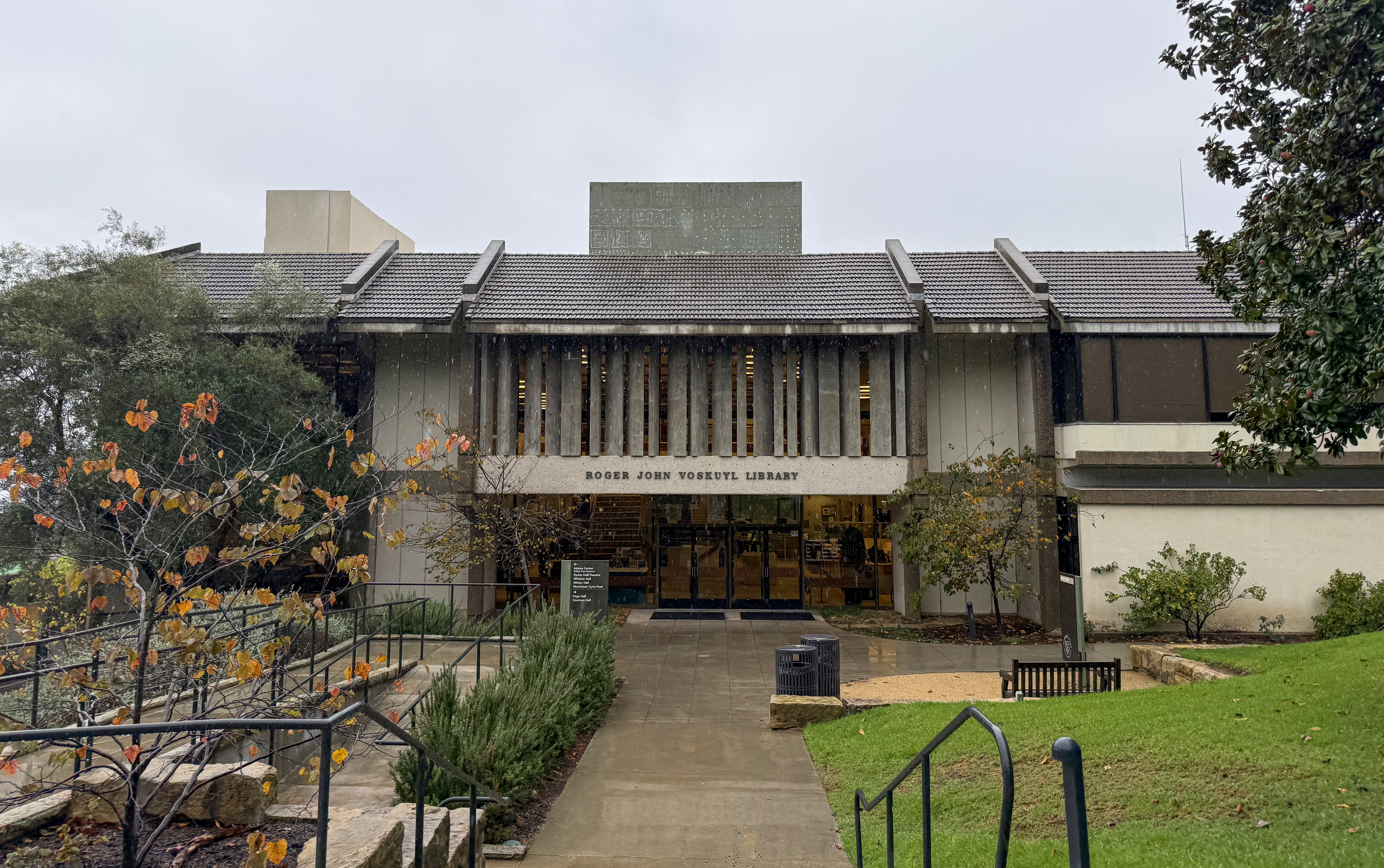
Voskuyl Library at Westmont in 2025

Ruth Kerr, owner and CEO of the Kerr Glass Manufacturing Company, established the school as the Bible Missionary Institute in 1937 on the former Westlake School for Girls campus near Downtown Los Angeles. It was renamed the Western Bible College in 1939. During these early years, Kerr and the other founders decided that a liberal arts curriculum was the best direction for the school. In 1940 Wallace Emerson, the first president, renamed the school Westmont College, derived from a college in the west and in the mountains. He envisioned a Christian liberal arts college that would take its place among the best in the nation.

By 1944, Westmont College had outgrown its facilities in Los Angeles. After a failed attempt to move the campus to Altadena in early 1945, the desperate search for a new campus led Mrs. Kerr and the trustees to "El Tejado", the former 125-acre (51 ha) Dwight Murphy estate in Montecito. Westmont purchased this property and moved to the Santa Barbara area in the fall of 1945.

Set in the foothills of the Santa Ynez Mountains, Westmont's wooded and scenic acres provide an environment for a residential college. The campus includes buildings and land from two former estates and the historic Deane School for Boys. The grounds still feature the pathways, stone bridges, and garden atmosphere typical of Montecito, a suburb of Santa Barbara.

While Westmont has sought to preserve and use the original structures, it has also built new facilities, including Voskuyl Library, the restored Westmont Art Center, the A. Nelson Science Building, the Murchison Gymnasium Complex, and the Ruth Kerr Memorial Student Center. In 2008 Westmont broke ground for the construction of the Winter Hall for Science and Mathematics and the Adams Center for the Visual Arts.

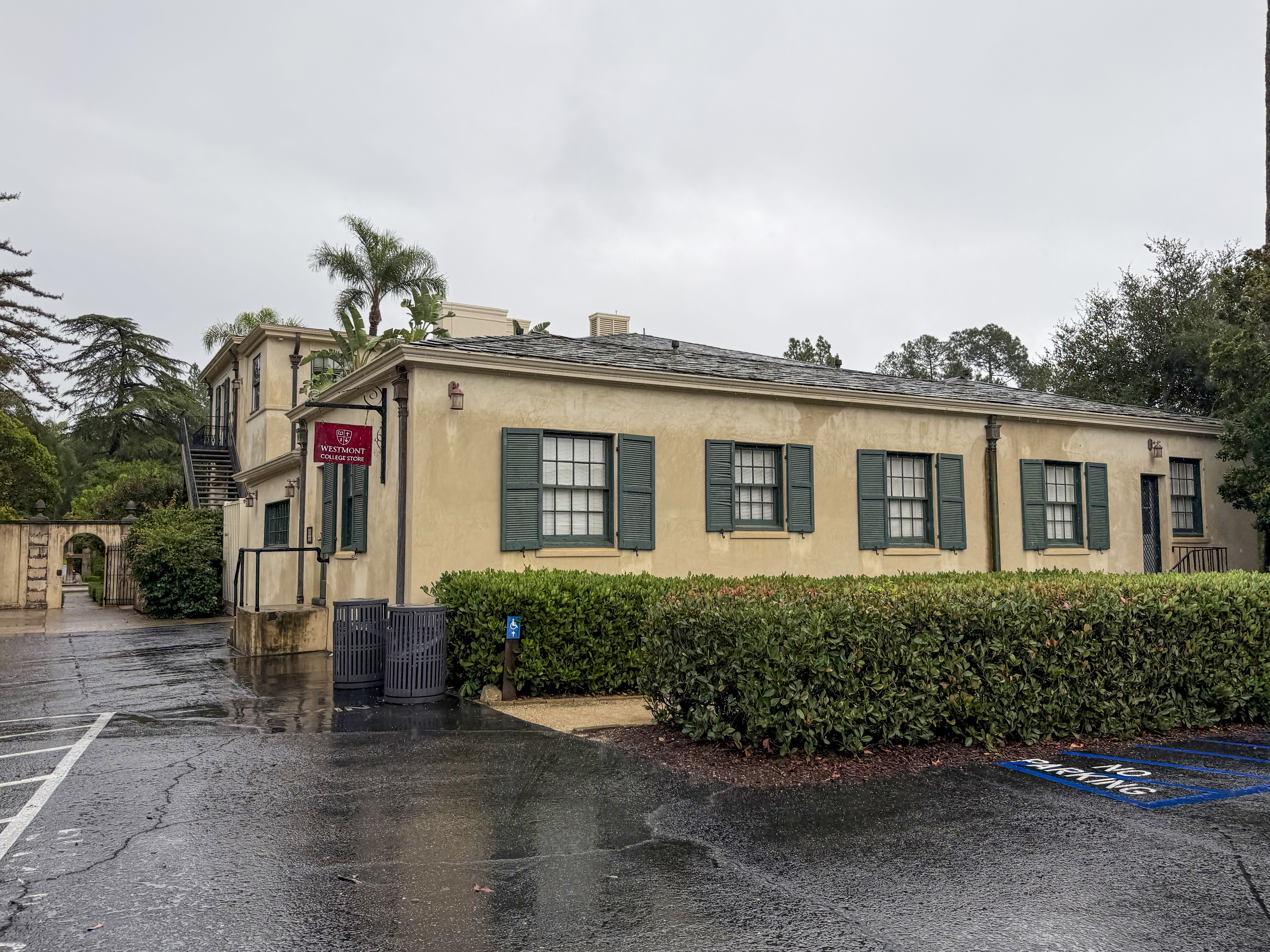
Bookstore at Westmont in 2025

In 2006, Westmont received a gift pledge of $75 million from an anonymous donor, the second largest gift ever to a national liberal arts college at the time. In September 2009 Westmont was informed that the donor withdrew the pledged $75 million gift, which caused the college to put off construction of two new buildings.

=== Wildfires ===
Westmont is located in a high fire area with limited access via narrow winding roads. Campus buildings were burned in fires in 1964, 1977, and 2008, and the campus has been threatened or partially damaged by fires on multiple other occasions. The campus is routinely used as a staging area for firefighters when fires threaten the Montecito area. As a condition of approval of their Master Plan, Westmont agreed to a controversial "shelter in place" plan, also called "stay and defend" procedure, in case of a wildfire. The college has a comprehensive wildfire response plan in place.

==== Coyote Fire of 1964 ====
The Coyote Fire began on September 22, 1964, in a canyon near Westmont's campus. The fire burned 75,000 acres and over 100 homes. Catherwood Hall, a men's dorm on the Westmont campus, was destroyed.

==== Sycamore Canyon Fire of 1977 ====
The Sycamore Canyon Fire began on July 26, 1977, when a kite blew into power lines. Nearly 200 homes were burned, including several homes of Westmont employees, as well as 40 acres of undeveloped college property and part of an athletic field.

==== Tea Fire of 2008 ====
On November 13, 2008, the steep and wooded Westmont campus was heavily damaged in the Tea Fire, which started in the hills near Montecito. No injuries were reported on the campus. Numerous structures on the campus, including the Physics Lab, Psychology Building, Math Building, and 15 faculty homes were destroyed. The Clark residence hall was severely damaged. The Quonset Huts were also destroyed. Much of the campus's landscaping, consisting of oaks, eucalyptus trees and semi-arid vegetation, was burned.

Flames were spotted above upper campus around 5:30 p.m. on November 13. Students were led to Murchison Gymnasium, where they remained until the situation outside was safe. Doors and openings were sealed with masking tape to prevent smoke entry and a ventilation system was activated. The American Red Cross provided blankets and pillows to the hundreds of Westmont students, neighbors, and Preview/Visiting students. In the early morning after the immediate danger had passed, students were allowed to access their cars in certain parking lots and leave the campus. Others remained in the gymnasium until they found a ride off campus. Friends, family, local churches, and other sources provided temporary housing to refugees.

Classes resumed December 1 with the semester ending, as originally planned, on December 19, 2008.

==== Thomas Fire of 2017 ====
The Westmont campus was evacuated in December 2017 due to the Thomas Fire. The last week of classes for the semester was cancelled, and final exams were administered as take-home exams. The campus was defended by a volunteer fire brigade, and it became one of the headquarters for CAL FIRE firefighting efforts. No campus buildings were destroyed, and students returned to start the spring semester as scheduled on January 8, 2018, only to evacuate again on January 10 because of the threat of mudslides following the fire. The combined risk of fire and mudslide led to a record five evacuations of campus during the 2017–2018 school year, but the campus ultimately suffered minimal damage.

== Campus ==
Westmont College is located a few miles off of U.S. Route 101 just to the east of Santa Barbara. The city of Santa Barbara is on the central California coast and is 100 miles northwest of Los Angeles and 330 miles south of San Francisco.

The campus itself resides in the hills of Montecito and features 110 acres (45 ha) of hills, gardens, and trees. A small creek runs through the campus, often dry during summer and autumn months and typically full during the rainy spring months. It has even flooded campus buildings in El Niño years.

The campus has six on-campus dorms and one off-campus residence hall. The two freshman dorms are Page Hall and Clark Hall, which are located at the upper corners of campus. Armington Hall, housing the largest number of students on campus, is at the lowest point on campus. Emerson Hall (formerly known as New Dorm and Everest), is at the top of campus and has ocean views in many of its rooms. Emerson Hall houses first-year students, transfer students, and second-year students. Van Kampen Hall is located in the center of the campus and was renovated and modernized in the summer of 2006. The Global Leadership Center is Westmont's newest residence hall, consisting of three separate buildings, North and South residence halls and the center, which includes a classroom, seminar room, lounge, offices, and a coffee shop. Some upperclass students live in the Ocean View Apartments, a college-owned apartment building on the east side of Santa Barbara located three miles from campus.

== Academics ==
Westmont was ranked 108th in the U.S. News & World Report "America's Best Colleges 2019" list of liberal arts colleges. In 2016 Forbes ranked Westmont No. 236 out of the 660 best private and public colleges and universities in America. The Templeton Foundation has recognized Westmont as one of the nation's top 100 colleges committed to character development.

Academic rankings

Liberal arts
- U.S. News & World Report: 108

National
- Forbes: 236
- Washington Monthly: 170

Westmont offers 26 majors and has a student/faculty ratio of 12 to 1 with 96 percent of tenured and tenure-track faculty having earned terminal degrees. The average class size is 18 students. The students come from 25 states, 11 countries, and 33 Christian denominations. The four-year graduation rate is 87 percent.

=== Off-campus programs ===
Off-campus programs are an important part of the Westmont experience with over 60 percent of students participating in a program at some point in their studies. Westmont offers a number of off-campus programs. These programs are run with a faculty member and include the Europe semester, England Semester, Westmont in Mexico, Westmont in the Middle East, and Westmont in San Francisco Urban program. A limited number of students may request a spot to participate in semester exchanges at one of the colleges in the Christian College Consortium, such as Gordon College, Houghton College, Seattle Pacific University, and Wheaton College (IL). Additionally, some students can apply to participate in other qualifying programs, including semesters in New Zealand, Belize, Washington DC, Chile, Italy, France, and Lithuania.

Students receive transferable credit while they live and study abroad in these different programs. Some students work in internships while they are off campus, and many choose the Westmont in San Francisco program for this purpose.

== Student life ==
=== LGBT prohibition ===
Westmont student policy forbids gay marriage and all sex or intimacy outside of heterosexual marriage. Students must agree to avoid "homosexual practice" which has at times been understood to forbid not only same-sex sexual activity and relationships but also coming out of the closet. Alumni have reported to outside media organizations they feared expulsion if their sexuality was discovered. Professors are allegedly forbidden from discussing homosexuality in front of students.

In May 2023, Westmont president Gayle D. Beebe sent a letter to the United States Department of Education seeking assurance that Westmont could legally discriminate against students on the basis of sexual orientation. Westmont is exempt from certain sections of Title IX (meaning they can discriminate against, among others, gay students), even though they claim otherwise on their website.

There is an "official-unofficial" group for LGBT students called Gradient. The group meets in secret to maintain confidentiality and is not officially recognized by the school.

=== Spring Sing ===
Westmont hosts a popular annual student event Spring Sing, which in past years has been held at the Santa Barbara County Bowl or UC Santa Barbara auditorium. This event is a competition between the dorms with eight-minute musical comedy skits.

The skits incorporate an average of four or five clips of popular songs with altered original lyrics and original choreography. The lyrics are usually changed to reflect a humorous progression of the skit's main story. The dorm that wins has bragging rights for the next year.

=== Potter's Clay ===
Potter's Clay is a popular ministry program that occurs every year in Ensenada, Mexico, during Westmont's spring break. Students interact with the local population and churches to help with construction, Vacation Bible School, and medical work.

== Media ==
Westmont maintained a radio station named Spark Radio until 2010.

The Horizon is the on-campus student newspaper.

== Athletics ==
The Westmont athletic teams are called the Warriors. The college is a member of the National Association of Intercollegiate Athletics (NAIA), primarily competing in the Golden State Athletic Conference (GSAC) for most of its sports since the 1986–87 academic year; while its women's swimming team competes in the Pacific Collegiate Swim and Dive Conference (PCSC).

Westmont competes in 15 intercollegiate varsity sports: Men's sports include baseball, basketball, cross country, golf, soccer, tennis and track & field; while women's sports include basketball, cross country, golf, soccer, swimming, tennis, track & field and volleyball.

On July 14, 2022, Westmont College was notified by the National Collegiate Athletic Association (NCAA) that it has been accepted into the multi-year membership process for Division II, while subsequently joining the Pacific West Conference (PacWest), effective beginning the 2023–24 academic year.

== Notable people ==
=== Alumni ===
- Alvin O. Austin – president of Le Tourneau University
- Greg Bahnsen – theologian, Christian reconstructionist, Presbyterian minister, and Calvinist apologist
- Michael G. Bailey - attorney and civil servant
- Diana Butler Bass - historian of Christianity and advocate for progressive Christianity
- Tiffany Michelle Brissette – actress
- Melissa Chaty – beauty pageant contestant
- Priya David – news correspondent
- Shane Drake – music video director and producer, Winner of the 2006 MTV Video Music Award for Video of the Year for Panic! at the Disco's "I Write Sins Not Tragedies".
- Anita Perez Ferguson – former White House liaison for the US Department of Transportation
- Kristen Flores – founder and CEO of the Feel Good Film Festival, actress, set and production designer and film producer
- John Hart – news correspondent and television anchor
- Allen Hopkins – sportscaster
- David Allan Hubbard – president of Fuller Seminary and Old Testament scholar
- Bob Huff – politician
- Chad Kammerer – professional basketball coach
- Robert King (writer) - film and television writer and producer
- Kristin Olsen – politician
- Jean-Louis Ravelomanantsoa – Malagasy Olympic sprinter and professional track athlete
- George Alan Rekers – psychologist and ordained Southern Baptist minister, anti-homosexual activist who was mired in a 2010 scandal involving a young male escort
- Michael Dean Shelton - socialite, activist, and CEO of the Shelton Family Foundation
- Ron Shelton - film director
- Kevin J. Vanhoozer – theology professor

=== Faculty ===
- Jerry Blackstone – former music professor, Grammy Award-winning music conductor and director of choirs at the University of Michigan School of Music, Theatre and Dance.
- Ronald Enroth – sociology professor and expert on cults
- Robert H. Gundry – scholar-in-residence, author of Bible reference books, commentaries and articles
- Tremper Longman III – Old Testament professor and scholar
- Shirley Mullen – former history professor and provost, president of Houghton College.
- Donald J. Patterson – Professor of math and computer science
- Randy Pfund – former basketball assistant coach, former Los Angeles Lakers coach, and former Miami Heat executive
- Sandra L. Richter - Old Testament professor and scholar
- Peter W. Stoner – Christian apologist and author of Science Speaks
