= Sandra L. Richter =

American Hebrew Bible scholar (born 1961)

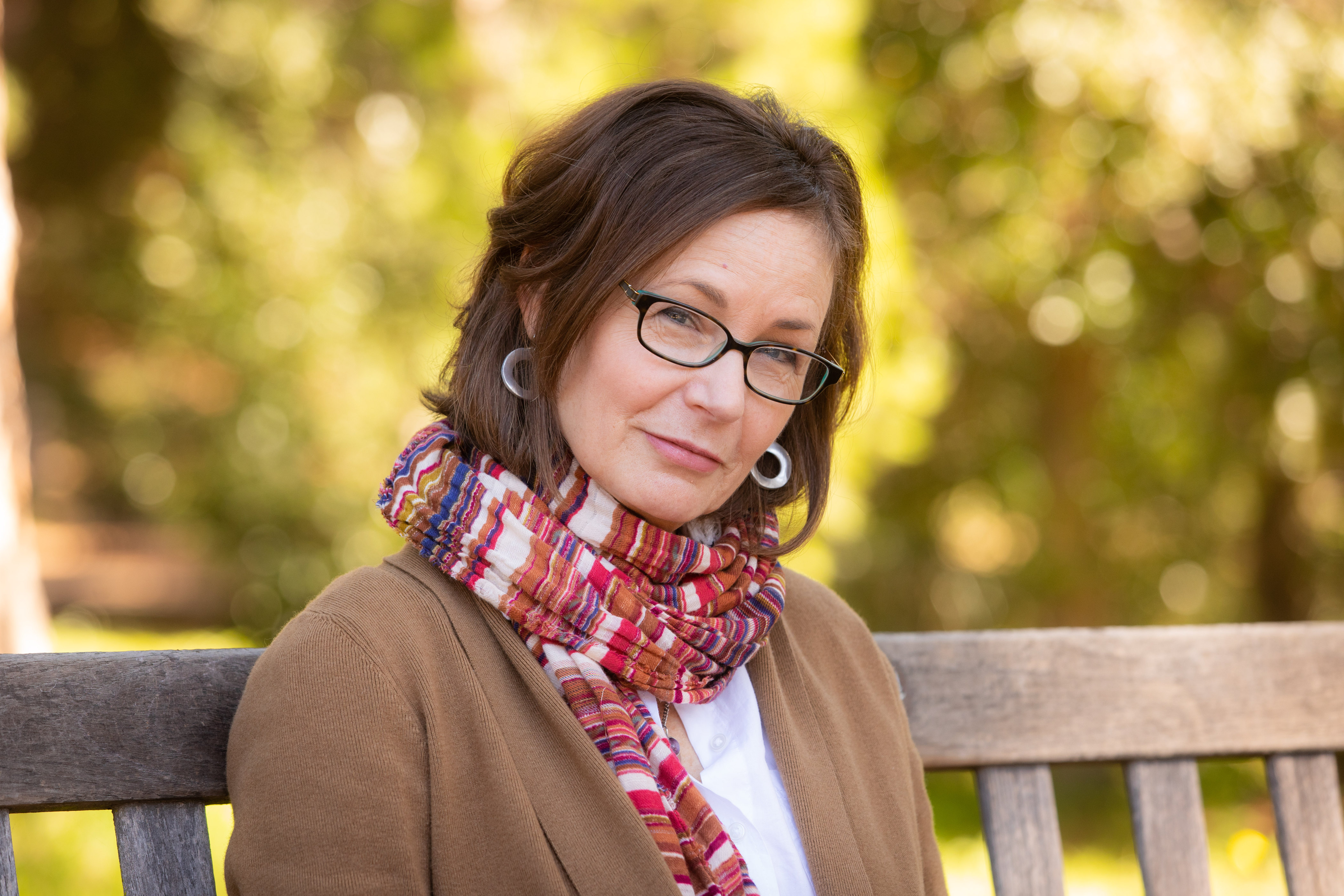
- Born: February 13, 1961 (age 65)
- Occupations: Professor; author; speaker
- Title: Robert H. Gundry Chair of Biblical Studies

Academic background
- Education: University of Valley Forge (B.S.); Gordon-Conwell Theological Seminary (MATS); Harvard University

Academic work
- Discipline: Old Testament studies
- Institutions: Westmont College

Sandra L. Richter (born February 13, 1961) is an Old Testament scholar, author, international speaker, and professor, who currently holds the Robert H. Gundry Chair of Biblical Studies at Westmont College in Santa Barbara, California. Her areas of specialization include Environmental theology, Hebrew Language, Deuteronomy, the Deuteronomistic history, and the intersection between Syro-Palestinian archaeology and the Bible.

== Biography ==
Richter earned her BS from the University of Valley Forge, her MA in Theology from Gordon–Conwell Theological Seminary, and her PhD in Hebrew Bible from Harvard University's Near Eastern Languages and Civilizations Department.

Richter began her academic career at Asbury Theological Seminary in Wilmore, Kentucky. Two of her works published while at Asbury are: The Deuteronomistic History and the Name Theology: l^{e}šakkēn š^{e}mô šām in the Bible and the Ancient Near East (2002), which Trygvve Mettinger describes as making "a high-profile contribution to the debate about a Deuteronomistic Name theology;" and The Epic of Eden: A Christian Entry into the Old Testament (2008), which provides an introduction to the Old Testament through the lens of covenant. Richter also began her work in environmental theology while at Asbury.

In 2009 Richter took a post at Wesley Biblical Seminary in Jackson, MS. While serving in Jackson, Richter began publishing curriculums with Seedbed which include The Epic of Eden: Understanding the Old Testament; The Epic of Eden: Isaiah; The Epic of Eden: Ruth for Seekers; and The Epic of Eden: Jonah, published with Seedbed Publishing. Her latest curriculum, The Epic of Eden: Psalms, published with HarperCollins Christian Publishing was released June 2021.

Richter moved to Wheaton College in Wheaton, IL in 2013 where she expanded her efforts in environmental theology. Her most recent book, Stewards of Eden: What Scripture Says About the Environment and Why It Matters (2020), awarded the 2020 ECPA Top Shelf Book Cover Award, encapsulates her research on the topic.

At Westmont College since 2017, Richter is continuing her work on the intersection of the Bible and archaeology.

== Professional activities and experience ==
Richter currently serves on the NIV Committee on Bible Translation. She has served as both president (2018–2019) and vice president (2017–2018) of the Pacific Region of the Society of Biblical Literature and is currently a Member at Large. She has served on the board of the Seminary Stewardship Alliance under Blessed Earth, the American Bible Society: Scripture and Translation Committee, the Institute of Biblical Research Program Committee, and on the Editorial Board for the Bulletin for Biblical Research.

== Selected publications ==
- (2005). "The Deuteronomistic History." Dictionary of the Old Testament: Historical Books. Edited by Bill T. Arnold and H. G. M. Williamson. Intervarsity Press.
- (2007). "A Biblical Theology of Creation Care: Is Environmentalism a Christian Value?" The Asbury Journal 62/1 (2007): 67–76.
- (2007). "The Place of the Name in Deuteronomy." Vetus Testamentum 57: 342–66.
- (2009). "The Bible and American Environmental Practice: An Ancient Code Addresses a Current Crisis." pp. 108–29 in The Bible and the American Future. Edited by Robert Jewett with Wayne L. Alloway Jr. and John G. Lacey. Eugene, OR: Cascade.
- (2010). "Environmental Law in Deuteronomy: One Lens on a Biblical Theology of Creation Care." Bulletin for Biblical Research 20.3: 331–54.
- (2014). "Environmental Law: Wisdom from the Ancients." Bulletin for Biblical Research 24.3: 307–29.
- (2017). "The Archaeology of Mt. Ebal and Mt. Gerizim and Why It Matters to Deuteronomy." pp. 304–37 in Sepher Torath Mosheh: Studies in the Composition and Interpretation of Deuteronomy. Edited by Daniel Block. Peabody, MA: Hendrickson.
- (2017). “The Question of Provenance and the Economics of Deuteronomy” Journal for the Study of the Old Testament 42.1: 23–50.
- (2019). "What's Money Got to Do with It? Economics and the Question of the Provenance of Deuteronomy in the Neo-Babylonian and Persian Periods." pp. 301–21 in Paradigm Change in Pentateuchal Research. Edited by Matthias Armgardt, Benjamin Kilchör, and Markus Zehnder. BZAR 22. Wiesbaden: Harrassowitz.
- (2020): “The Question of Provenance and the Economics of Deuteronomy: The Neo-Babylonian and Persian Periods” Catholic Biblical Quarterly, 82/4: 547–66.
- (2020). Stewards of Eden: What Scripture Says About Environmentalism and Why It Matters. Downers Grove, IL: InterVarsity Press.
- (2023). "Economics and Urdeuteronomium: A Response to Kåre Berge, Diana Edelman, Philippe Guillaume, and Benedetta Rossi." Journal for the Study of the Old Testament 48.1: 84–104.
