= Ronald J. Oakerson =

American political scientist (born 1944)

Ronald J. Oakerson (born c. 1944) is a professor emeritus of political science and intercultural studies at Houghton College. He has served previously as the college's Vice President and Dean, as well as the chairman of the Department of History and Political Science. He is a founding member of the National Rural Studies Council and served on the American Political Science Association's Task Force on Civic Education for the Next Century. Elinor Ostrom described Oakerson as an important contributor to the Institutional Analysis and Development Framework. On the version of the framework Oakerson presented at the Proceedings of the Conference on Common Property Resource Management at the National Research Council in April 1985, Ostrom wrote that it "...has influenced an untold number of studies of common-property regimes in many diverse sectors in all regions of the world."

Oakerson states, "The purpose of education is to build a bridge between generations, so as to preserve our accomplishments."

== Employment History ==
From 1985-88 he was a senior analyst with the US Advisory Commission on Intergovernmental Relations and directed the Commission's program on metropolitan government. He has previously taught at Marshall University and from 1988-92 was a scholar with the Ostrom Workshop in Political Theory and Policy Analysis at Indiana University Bloomington.

Oakerson is a former member of the Panel on Common Property Resources Management of the National Research Council and a coeditor of Making the Commons Work: Theory, Practice, and Policy (1992). From 1992-94 he served as the research director for the Program of Research on Market Transitions of the US Agency for International Development (Cameroon).

== Writings by Ronald J. Oakerson ==
- 'Analyzing the Commons: A Framework' in Making the commons work: Theory, practice and policy
- Governing Local Public Economies: Creating the Civic Metropolis
- Keepers of the Republic: A Civic View of American Politics
