= Armin B. Cremers =

German computer scientist (born 1946)

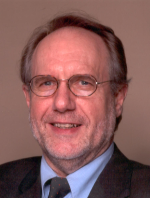
- Born: June 7, 1946 (age 80); Eisenach, Germany
- Education: University of Karlsruhe
- Scientific career
- Doctoral students: Wolfram Burgard; Dieter Fox; Sebastian Thrun
- Website: www.b-it-center.de/research-groups/emeritus-research-group-artificial-intelligence-foundations

Armin Bernd Cremers (born June 7, 1946) is a German mathematician and computer scientist. He is a professor in the computer science institute at the University of Bonn, Germany. He is most notable for his contributions to several fields of discrete mathematics including formal languages and automata theory. In more recent years he has been recognized for his work in artificial intelligence, machine learning and robotics as well as in geoinformatics and deductive databases.

== Life and work ==
Armin B. Cremers studied mathematics and physics at the University of Karlsruhe, Germany. After his graduate diploma (1971) and PhD (1972), both in mathematics, both summa cum laude, he received his academic lectureship qualification for computer science (1974), all from the University of Karlsruhe. Following an invitation by Seymour Ginsburg, he joined the University of Southern California (USC), Los Angeles, in 1973 where he worked until 1976 as an assistant professor of electrical engineering and computer science. With Ginsburg he initiated Grammar Forms, a new formalism for grammatical families.

In 1976 A. B. Cremers returned to Germany and was appointed to full professor of computer science at the University of Dortmund, where he remained until 1990, holding the chair for information systems. During the same time he continued working as a visiting research professor at USC, where together with Thomas N. Hibbard he developed the concept of Data Spaces, a comprehensive computational model, in theory and applications.

At the University of Dortmund A. B. Cremers served as chairman of the computer science department and, since early 1985, as vice president for Research and Junior Scientific Staff. In this position he was liaison for the development of the Technology Center Dortmund. He was the initiator and founding director of the Center for Expert Systems Dortmund (ZEDO) and the NRW State Research Collaborative in Artificial Intelligence (KI-NRW). From 1988 to 1996 he was also a member of the supervisory board of the German National Research Center for Mathematics and Data Processing (GMD).

Since 1990 A. B. Cremers has been professor and director of computer science and head of the research group in artificial intelligence at the University of Bonn. From Bonn he has contributed fundamentally to artificial intelligence and robotics (with Wolfram Burgard, Dieter Fox, Sebastian Thrun among his students), and to the development of software engineering, particularly in civil engineering, and information systems, particularly in the geosciences. The paper "The Interactive Museum Tour-Guide Robot" won the AAAI Classic Paper award of 2016. Together with Matthias Jarke A. B. Cremers established the Bonn-Aachen International Center for Information Technology (B-IT) in 2001 and led this as Founding Scientific Director from the University of Bonn side until his retirement from teaching in 2014.

From 2004 to 2008 Cremers was Dean of the School of Mathematics and Natural Sciences, and from April 2009 to July 2014 University Vice President for Planning and Finance. He is member of advisory boards, e.g., as well as Chairman of the University Council of the University of Koblenz-Landau.
