= Ralph F. Young =

American historian

Ralph F. Young is an American historian. He is the author of the popular textbook Dissent in America: Voices that Shaped a Nation and teaches history at Temple University.

== Biography ==
Young grew up outside New York City and attended Houghton College. He earned his M.A. and Ph.D. at Michigan State University. Young's dissertation was about Puritans in the 1600s and their impact on England. He protested the Vietnam War.

Young taught at the University of London and Bremen University in Germany for several years. After moving back to the United States, he owned a bookstore in Philadelphia and began writing novels. One of his novels won the Suntory Prize for suspense fiction. In 1996, he became an adjunct professor at Penn State University.

In 2000, Young was hired as a full-time instructor at Temple University. At Temple, Young created the popular teach-ins, during which students and professors examine current issues in light of historical events. He invited an Iraq War veteran to a teach-in in 2004 and Temple students discussed the nature of terrorism with him.

His writings have appeared in numerous publications like New England Quarterly, USA Today, and the History News Network. Dissent in America was first published in 2006. In it, Young argues that dissent is central to American history. In 2015, "Dissent: The History of An American Idea" was published.

He supported the Occupy movement. "In all protest movements," Young said, "everybody's got their own reasons for being there. But economic injustice, that involves thousands. This person's issue will be a lost mortgage; this one's is no jobs. These protesters want the government to listen. 'We are screaming in pain and all the government listens to is Wall Street,' they're saying. Under that umbrella comes many other things."

== Selected publications ==
- Young, Ralph (2006). Dissent in America: The Voices That Shaped a Nation. New York: Pearson Longman. ISBN 978-0205625895.
- Young, Ralph (March 2010). "Breathing the 'Free Aire of the New World': The Influence of the New England Way on the Gathering of Congregational Churches in Old England, 1640-1660". The New England Quarterly. LXXXIII (1): 5–46. doi:10.1162/tneq.2010.83.1.5. S2CID 57563479.
- Young, Ralph (2015). Dissent: The History of An American Idea. New York: NYU Press. ISBN 978-1479806652.
