= Houghton University =

Christian liberal arts university in Houghton, New York, US

- Former names: Houghton Seminary (1883–1923); Houghton College (1923–2022)
- Motto: Founded on the Rock
- Type: Private college
- Established: 1883; 143 years ago
- Religious affiliation: Wesleyan Church
- Endowment: $94.7 million (2025)
- President: Wayne D. Lewis, Jr.
- Academic staff: 53 FT/ 50 PT (2023)
- Students: 1,014 (2023)
- Undergraduates: 975 (2023)
- Postgraduates: 39 (2023)
- Location: Houghton, New York, United States; 42.426111°N 78.155278°W
- Campus: 1,300 acres (530 ha); Rural
- Colors: (Purple and gold)
- Nickname: Highlanders
- Website: houghton.edu
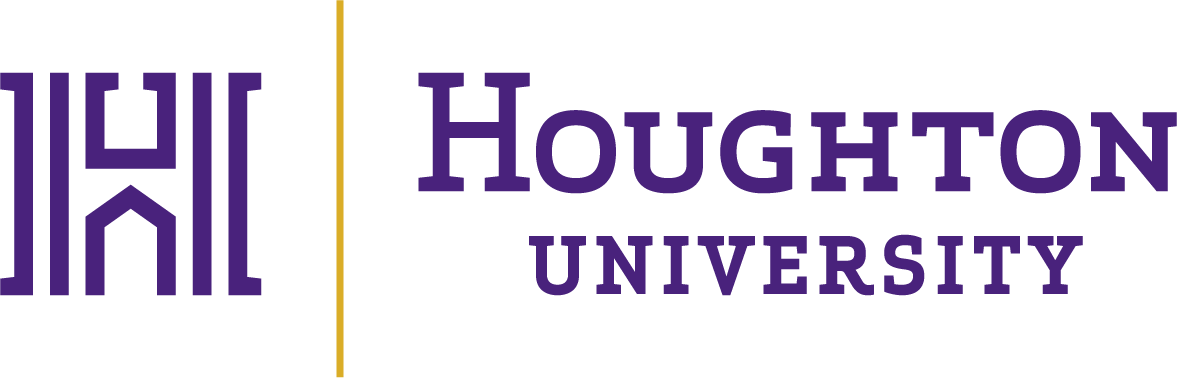

Houghton University is a private Christian liberal arts college in Houghton, New York, United States. Houghton was founded in 1883 by Willard J. Houghton and is affiliated with the Wesleyan Church. Houghton serves roughly 1000 students and has 54 degree majors for primarily undergraduate students.

== History ==
Houghton University began in 1883 as Houghton Seminary, a coeducational high school founded by Willard J. Houghton, a Wesleyan Methodist minister. In 1899, the first few college classes were offered. James S. Luckey was appointed president in 1908 and Houghton College received its provisional charter from New York in 1923. A permanent charter was granted in 1927, and accreditation by the Middle States Association of Colleges and Schools came in 1935. Stephen Paine was appointed president in 1937. When the former Buffalo Bible Institute merged with Houghton College in 1969, the West Seneca campus was created. Wilber Dayton was appointed president in 1972 and he was succeeded by Daniel R. Chamberlain in 1976. The university initiated its first master's degree program in 2004 and currently offers nine such degrees. Shirley Mullen was appointed president in 2006, and was succeeded by Wayne Lewis in 2023. From 2012 to 2013, the university set new records of giving to the institution for two years in a row. Despite this, Houghton University faced financial and enrollment challenges which led to academic budget cuts for the 2014–2015 academic year. This led to a "strategic reallocation of resources" which led to the development of several new majors including Music Industry, Sports Management, and Data Science. Houghton was approved to become a university in July 2022.

== Campus ==
Houghton University's main campus is in the hamlet of Houghton, in Allegany County, New York, about 65 miles (105 km) southeast of Buffalo, New York, and 70 miles (110 km) southwest of Rochester, New York. The 1,300 acres (5.3 km^{2}) of campus sit on the Allegheny Plateau at roughly 1,300 feet (400 m), on the site of the former Caneadea Indian Reservation. The school has one of the largest solar arrays in the state.

== Academics ==
Houghton University grants associate and bachelor's degrees in 46 majors. The university also offers six graduate degrees, including through the Greatbatch School of Music.

=== Rankings ===
Houghton University is ranked tied for #124 in National Liberal Arts Colleges in the 2020 Best Colleges rankings by U.S. News & World Report.

=== First Year Honors Program ===
A First Year Honors Program for qualified first-year students has two options: London Honors, and Science Honors. In London Honors, students spend their spring semester in London studying the development of the western world. London Honors involves taking integrated classes during the fall semester, then traveling to London in the spring semester, where the city becomes their classroom. Science Honors takes place during both first-year semesters and involves research in recent real-world issues such as fuel-efficiency, climate change, and energy sources.

== Student life ==
There are four traditional residence halls and four townhouses residences. Two of the traditional residence halls, East Hall and Lambein Hall, are female residences. Rothenbuhler Hall and Shenawana Hall are male residences. Sophomore, junior, and senior students have the option to live in the townhouses. Houghton University is a distinctly residential campus but does allow for upper class students the opportunity to apply to live in approved off-campus housing, called Community Living Opportunities (CLOs). Many organizations and clubs are available for students to join, or they may found their own.

== Athletics ==
Houghton Highlanders
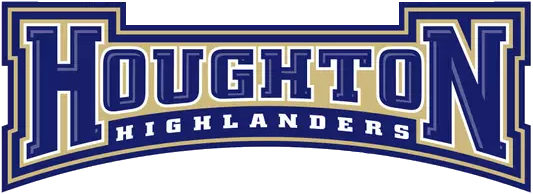
- University: Houghton University
- Nickname: Highlanders
- NCAA: Division III
- Conference: Empire 8
- Athletic director: Matthew Webb
- Location: Houghton, New York
- Varsity teams: 16
- Basketball arena: Nielsen Center
- Colors: Purple and Gold
- Mascot: Luckey
- Website: athletics.houghton.edu

The Houghton athletic teams are called the Highlanders. The university is a member of the Division III level of the National Collegiate Athletic Association (NCAA), primarily competing in the Empire 8 Athletic Conference (a.k.a. Empire 8) since the 2012–13 academic year. The Highlanders previously competed in the defunct American Mideast Conference of the National Association of Intercollegiate Athletics (NAIA) from 2001–02 to 2011–12.

Houghton competes in 17 intercollegiate varsity sports: Men's sports include baseball, basketball, cross country, soccer, track & field (indoor and outdoor) and volleyball; while women's sports include basketball, cross country, field hockey, soccer, softball, tennis, track & field (indoor and outdoor), and volleyball.

=== Accomplishments ===
Houghton's first national champion was Kaitlin Fadden who won the 2008 NAIA Outdoor Track and Field marathon event in a time of 2:57:10. It was the first NAIA national championship, either for a team or individual, for Houghton College.

May 2012 graduate Danielle Brenon was the NAIA Outdoor Track and Field national champion in the marathon.

In 2014, the university opened the Kerr-Pegula Athletic Complex thanks to a $12 million gift from 1991 graduate Kim Pegula. The complex is named after Pegula's father Ralph Kerr, an instructor in Houghton's Adult Education program, and her husband Terrence Pegula. Three lighted turf facilities are home to the Houghton Highlander soccer, baseball, softball, field hockey, and outdoor track. The multipurpose field house includes an eight-lane, 200-meter track and six tennis courts, offering a competition venue for the indoor track and tennis programs. It also provides dedicated practice space for outdoor sports over the winter and during inclement weather and serves as a hub of involvement for the campus and the surrounding communities of Northern Allegany County and Western New York.

=== Club and intramural sports ===
The university also offers club and intramural sports for men and women, including flag football, soccer, volleyball, basketball, and indoor soccer. Co-ed club and intramural sports are handball, water polo, and volleyball. Co-ed ultimate frisbee is also a popular sport. Club disc golf was added in 2021, and the university features two on-campus 18-hole disc golf courses.

== Controversies ==
In 2020 two Houghton alumni presented an exhibition called "We Are All Houghton" to highlight the voices of LGBTQ+ students at Houghton and their negative experiences on campus. This project had a mixed reception by students and alumni, as some thought it was a much needed discussion, while others thought it promoted anti-biblical principles.

In April 2023, Houghton fired two employees, stating in both their termination letters that one of the reasons was because they included their gender pronouns in their email signatures, which violated institutional policy forbidding the use of pronouns in signatures.

== Notable alumni ==
- Robert Beckford, a British academic theologian and a professor of Theology and Culture in the African Diaspora at Canterbury Christ Church University,
- Deborah L. Birx, United States Global AIDS Coordinator and Ambassador-at-Large, as well as White House Coronavirus Response Coordination Director under President Trump
- Ira S. Bowen, astronomer, director of Mt Wilson and Palomar Observatories 1946–1964
- Douglas Comer, Professor of Computer Science at Purdue University
- Ronald Enroth, evangelical Christian author
- Victor P. Hamilton, Theologian and biblical scholar. Professor Emeritus of Old Testament at Asbury University.
- Rachel Boone Keith, Liberian-born physician in Detroit
- Neil MacBride, Vice President of Anti-Piracy and General Counsel of the Business Software Alliance, formerly Chief Counsel on the Senate Judiciary Committee and Assistant U.S. Attorney in the Criminal Division of the U.S. Department of Justice.
- Dr. Richard J. Mouw, president of Fuller Theological Seminary for twenty years, 1993–2013
- Kim Pegula, co-owner of the Buffalo Bills and President/CEO of Pegula Sports and Entertainment
- George Beverly Shea, Dove Award-winning musician with the Billy Graham Crusade
- William A. Smalley, linguist
- Nora Lawrence Smith, newspaper publisher
- Bruce Waltke, professor at Reformed Theological Seminary
- Ralph F. Young, historian at Temple University

== Gallery ==
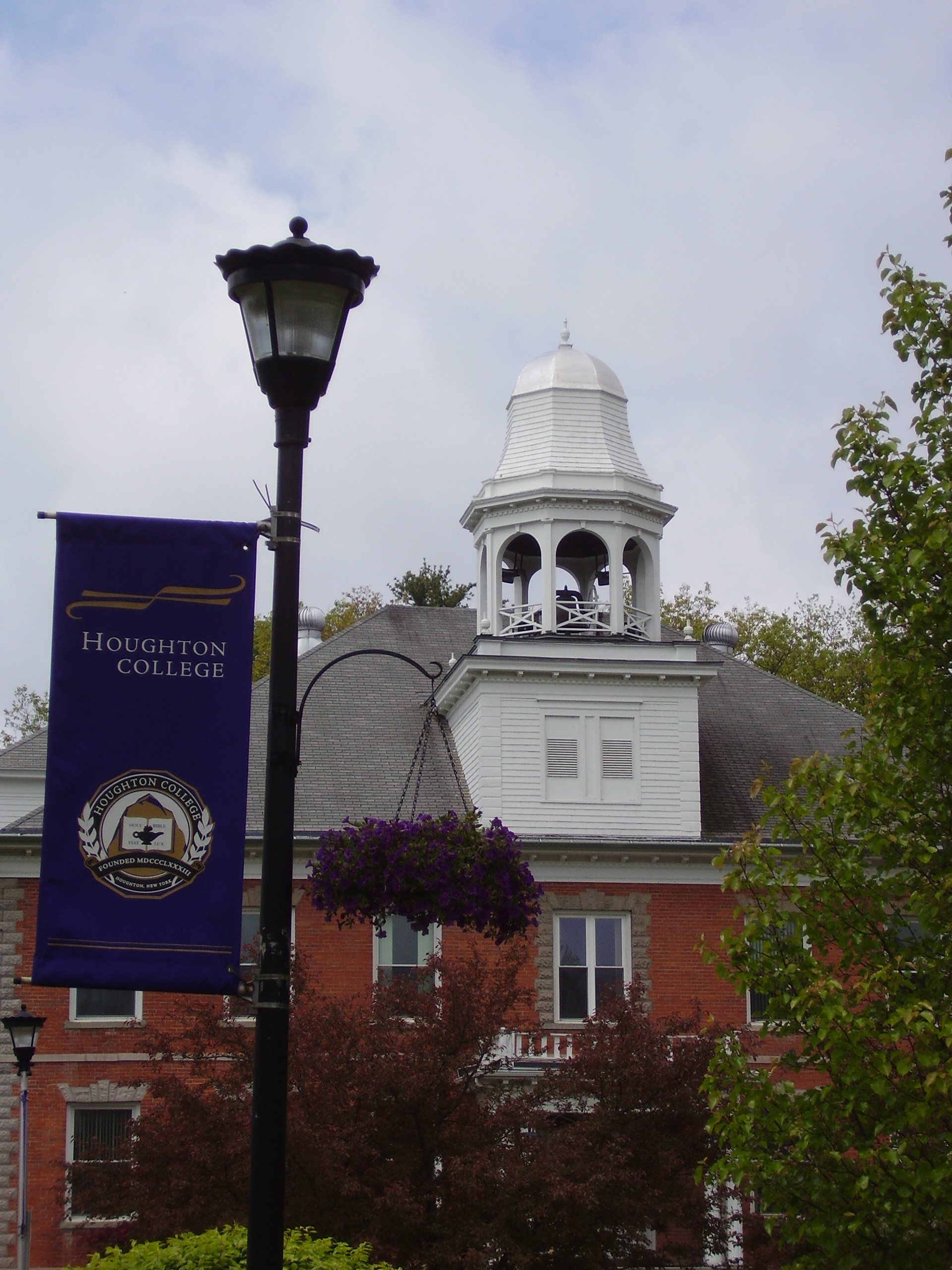
Fancher Hall, oldest building on campus. Home to the Office of Admissions.

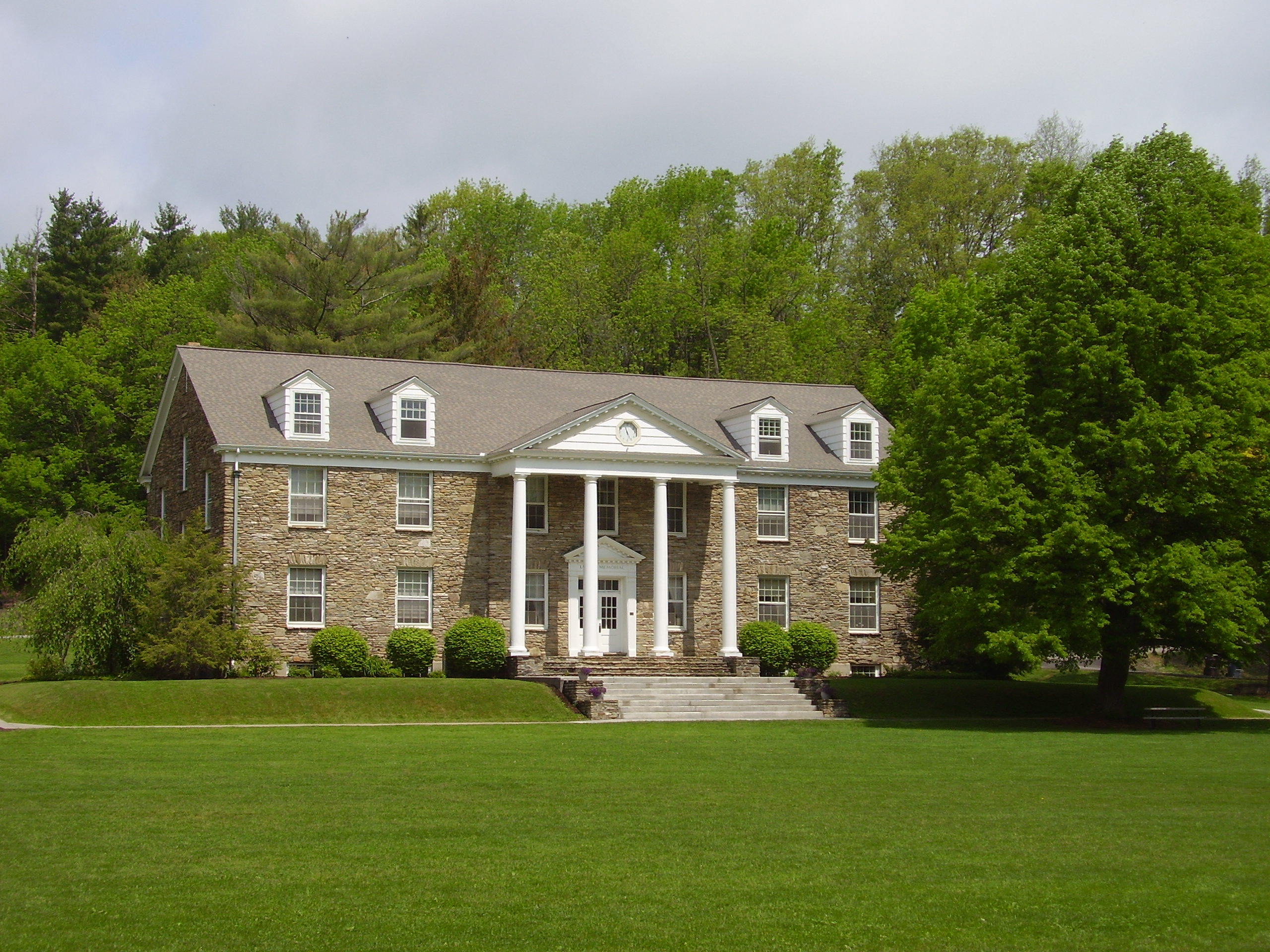
Luckey Memorial Building. Home of the Office of the President, as well as other administrative offices.

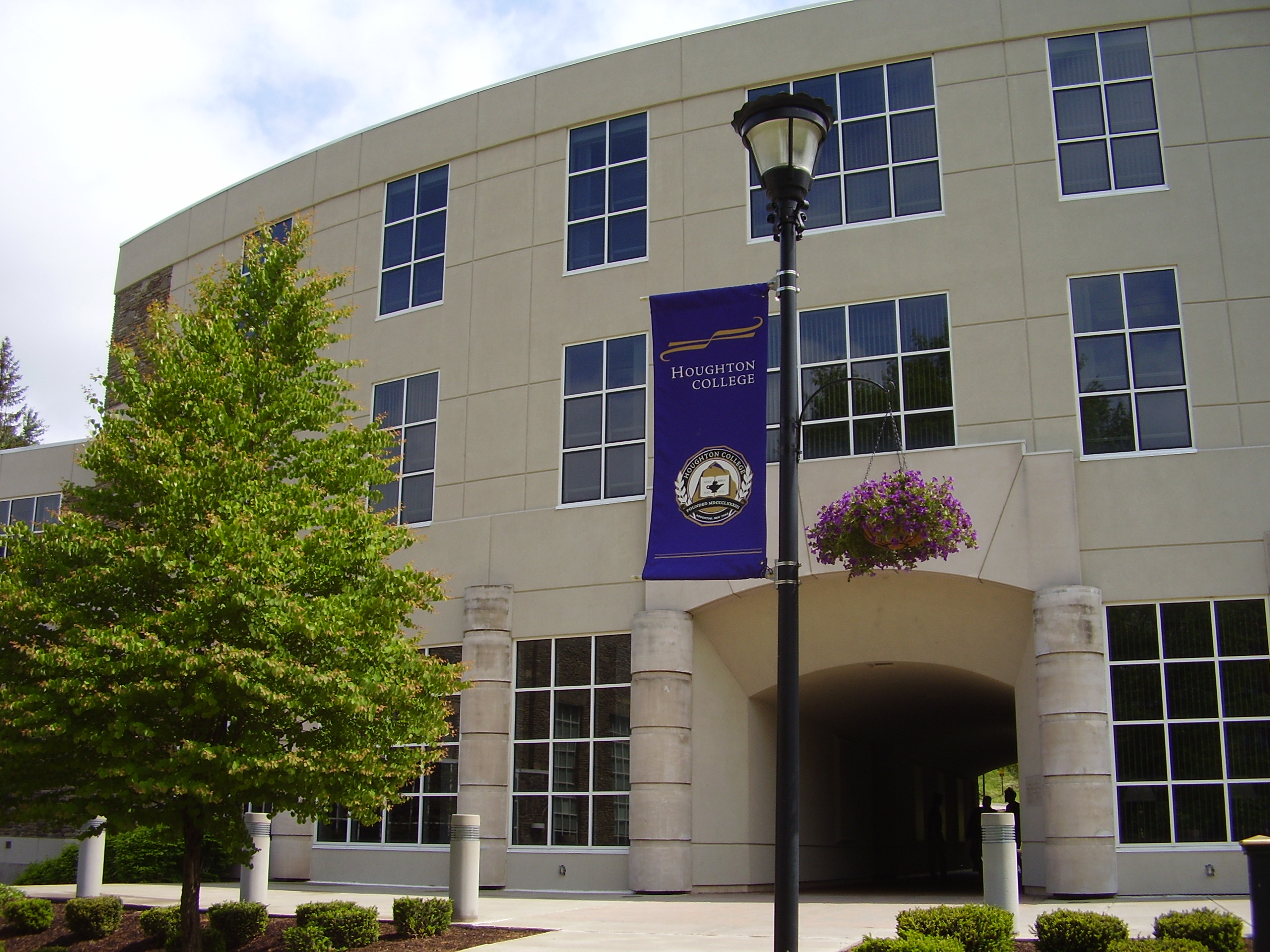
The Greatbatch School of Music

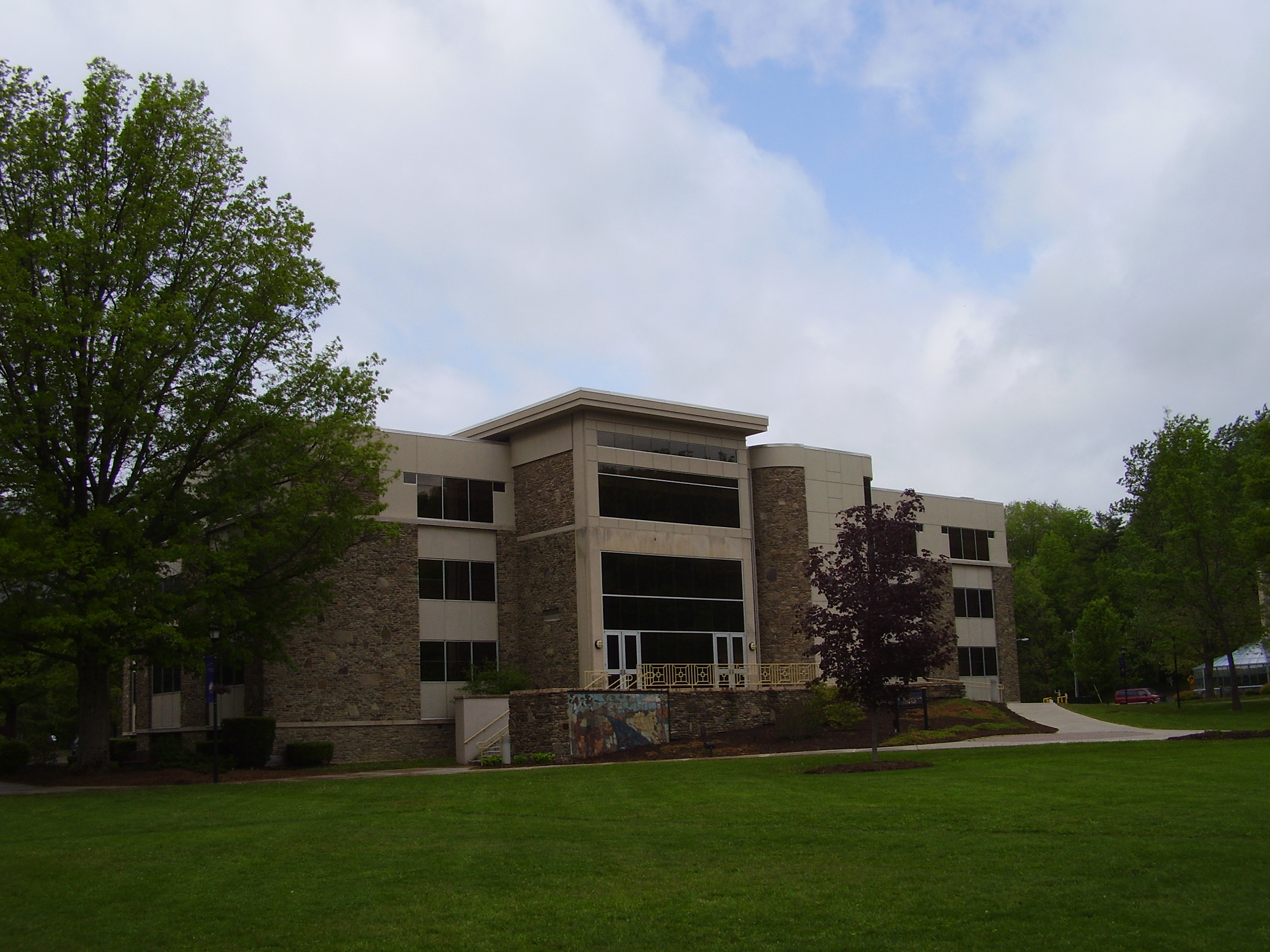
Willard J. Houghton Library

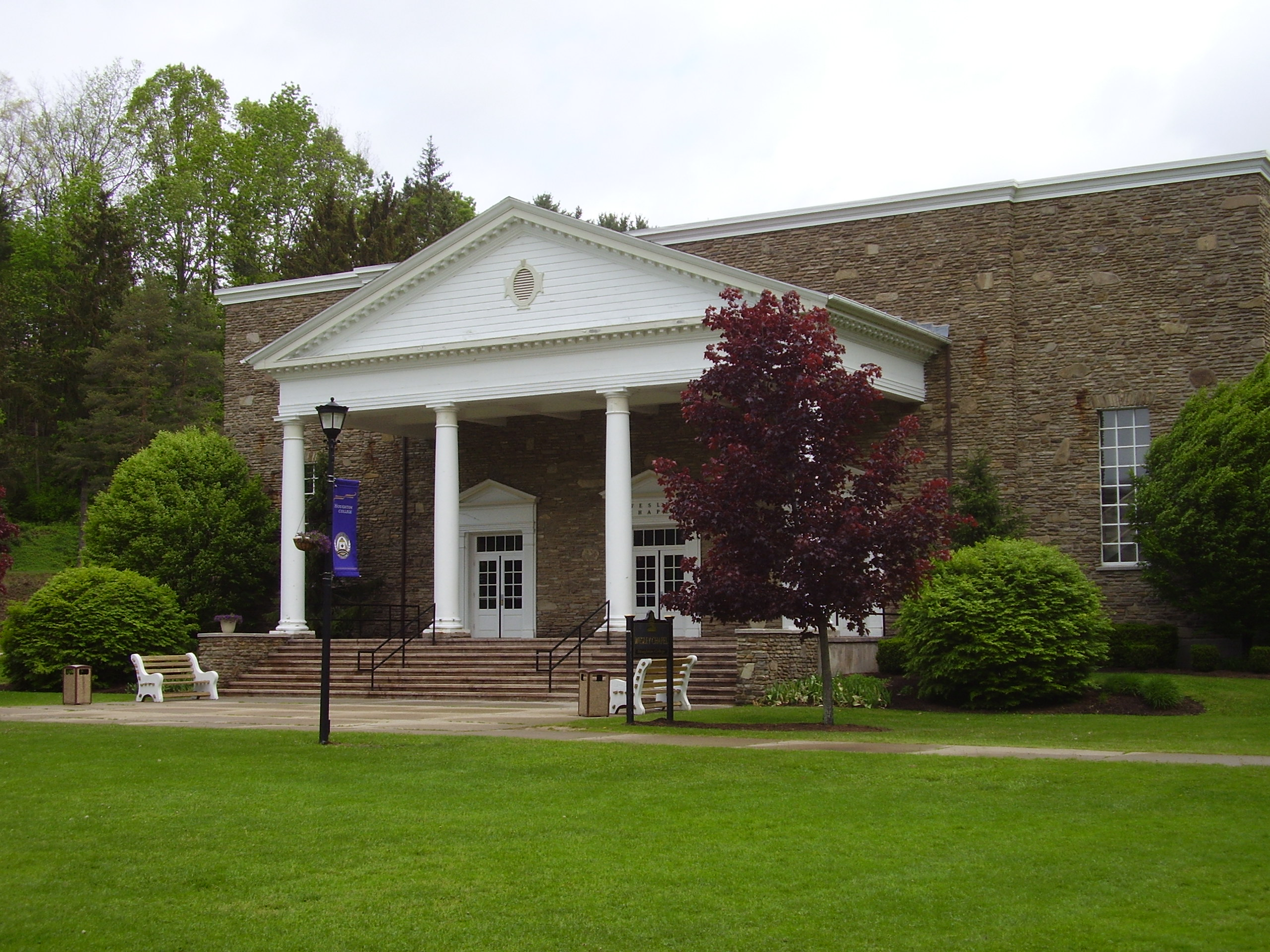
Wesley Chapel

== See also ==
- Ronald J. Oakerson
