= Maren Bennewitz =

German computer scientist

Maren Bennewitz is a German computer scientist who works at the University of Bonn as Professor for Humanoid Robots and Vice Rector for Digitalization and Information Management. Her research concerns robotics, including motion planning for mobile robots, humanoid robots, and human–robot interaction.

== Early life and education ==
Bennewitz earned a diplom (the German equivalent of a master's degree in 1999 in computer science from the University of Bonn. She completed a doctorate (Dr. rer. nat.) at the University of Freiburg in 2004, with the dissertation Mobile Robot Navigation in Dynamic Environments supervised by Wolfram Burgard.

== Career ==
After continuing at the University of Freiburg as a postdoctoral researcher, she became an assistant professor there in 2008. In 2014 she returned to the University of Bonn, taking her present position as Professor for Humanoid Robots. She became Vice Rector for Information Technology and Knowledge Transfer in 2015, and has been Vice Rector for Digitalization and Information Management since 2021.
