= Dieter Fox =

German roboticist

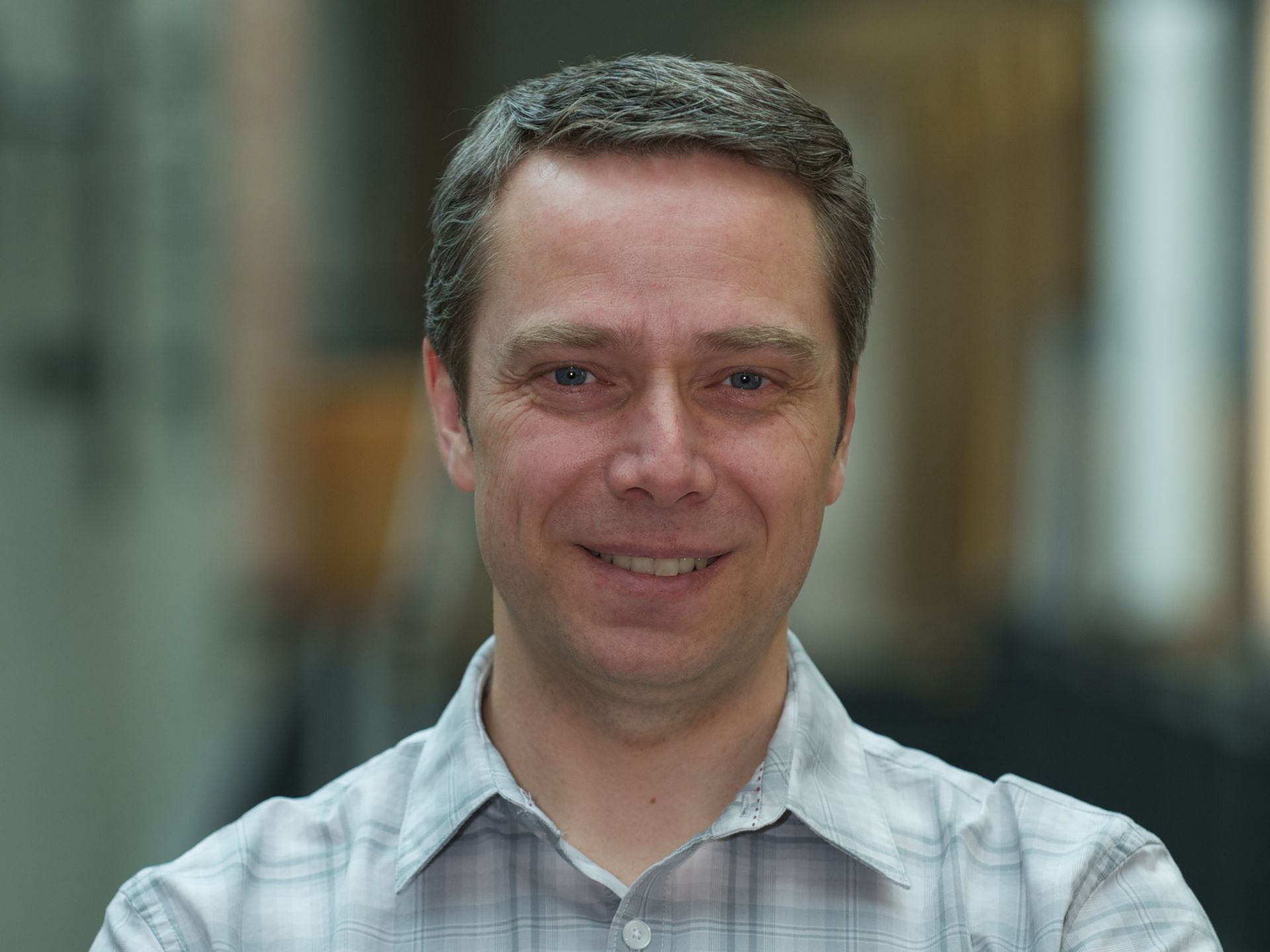
- Fox in 2012
- Born: 1966 (age 59–60)
- Education: University of Bonn
- Scientific career
- Fields: Robotics
- Workplaces: University of Washington, Seattle
- Doctoral advisor: Armin B. Cremers
- Doctoral students: Donald J. Patterson

Dieter Fox is a German-American roboticist and a Professor in the Department of Computer Science & Engineering at the University of Washington, Seattle. He received his PhD in Computer Science at the University of Bonn in 1998 on mobile robot localization and navigation. He is most notable for his contributions to several fields including robotics, artificial intelligence, machine learning, and ubiquitous computing. Together with Wolfram Burgard and Sebastian Thrun he is a co-author of the book Probabilistic Robotics. He was elected an AAAI Fellow in 2011. He was previously the Senior Director of Robotics Research at Nvidia. In July 2025, he joined the Allen Institute for AI, where he leads a new robotics effort aimed at advancing real-world robots using foundation models and simulation.
