= University of Technology Nuremberg =

Public university in Nuremberg, Germany

Coordinates: 49°25′12″N 11°6′15″E

- Technische Universität Nürnberg
- Type: Public
- Established: 2021; 5 years ago
- President: Michael Huth
- Academic staff: 7
- Administrative staff: 106
- Students: 20
- Location: Ulmenstraße 52i, Nuremberg, Middle_Franconia, Bavaria, Germany
- Campus: Urban
- Website: utn.de

The University of Technology Nuremberg (UTN; German: Technische Universität Nürnberg) is a public technical university in Nuremberg, Bavaria, Germany, founded on 1 January 2021. This makes it the first new foundation of a public university in Bavaria since 1978.

== History ==
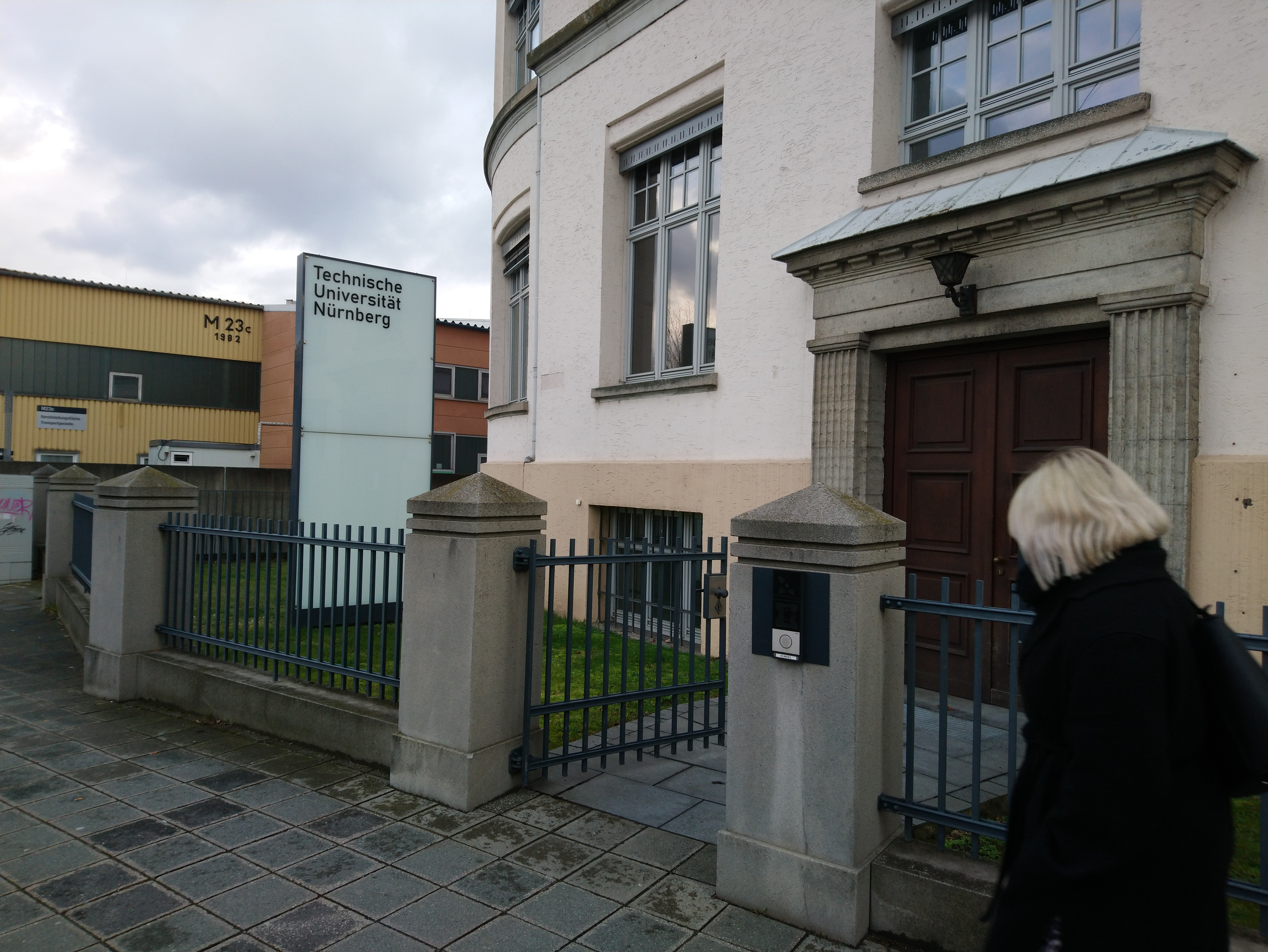
UTN Main Entrance

On 1 January 2021, Markus Zanner took up office as Chancellor of the University of Technology Nuremberg.

In February 2021, Hans Jürgen Prömel was named founding president to take office on 1 March 2021, initially for a term of five years.

The groundbreaking ceremony took place on the construction site in August 2021

The first building, the so-called Cube One, will be occupied by 2024. The foundation stone for the construction was laid in October 2022.

A sustainability concept is integrated into the design of all buildings on the campus from the outset. Since October 2021, the name of the first campus street has also been determined following a resolution by the Nuremberg City Council. It is named after the astrophysicist and mechanical engineer Luise Herzberg.

In December 2021, the University of Technology Nuremberg signed a cooperation agreement with the Nürnberg Institute of Technology. The Nürnberg Institute of Technology will build a modular building for health science courses on the campus of the UTN.

On 1 January 2022, Isa Jahnke began her duties as founding vice president for studies, teaching and international affairs. As an expert in digital didactics, she also holds the professorship "Information Science & Learning Technologies".

Since 1 April 2023 Alexander Martin is Founding Vice President for Research, Innovation and Entrepreneurship.

At the beginning of 2022, the University of Technology Nuremberg established the first department. Since 1 February 2022, the founding chair has been the Leibniz Prize holder Wolfram Burgard.

He will build the engineering department and set an initial focus at the UTN with the areas of artificial intelligence and robotics. The second department Liberal Arts and Sciences has been run since 1 April 2023 by the knowledge historian and Leibniz Prize winner Gyburg Uhlmann.

Teaching started in winter semester 2023/2024 with the English-language master's program "AI and Robotics".

== Education and Research ==
=== Masters ===
The university offers two courses at the moment:

1. Artificial Intelligence and Robotics (AIR): This course is intended for brilliant students who want to specialize in the field of AI and Robotics, and work in cutting edge research. The course structure is intense and requires 40+ hours of study per week from the students. The class sizes are small, allowing students to interact with one another and with the teaching team. The students from this course are expected to compete globally with students from other top universities like MIT, Stanford, Harvard, ETH. Students are also expected to contribute back to the society by taking on interdisciplinary courses that helps student apply their technical knowledge to social cause.
2. Human and Artificial Intelligence (HAI): This course is intended for students who want a truly interdisciplinary course, bridging the world of Computer Science and Humanities. This course is intended to invite discussions amongst people from different background.

=== Research ===
The university has two prestigious academic departments:

1. Department of Computer Science and Artificial Intelligence: Performs State of the Art (SOTA) Research in Machine Learning, Artificial Intelligence, and Robotics.
2. Department of Liberal Arts and Social Science: Performs quality research in science and humanities.

=== Vision ===
The university aims to be one of the best research universities in Europe in the next five years, and one of the best research institute in the world in the next ten years.

== Criticism ==
=== Double offers in the region ===
Criticism comes from the German Science and Humanities Council as it still sees a "need for clarification", because the new university creates double structures in the immediate vicinity of the University of Erlangen-Nuremberg and the Nürnberg Institute of Technology.

=== Demolition of the reloading halls ===
The old reloading halls at Nuremberg's former South Station were demolished instead of being integrated into the Technical University based on the concept originally proposed. Nuremberg's Stadtbild-Initiative (Cityscape Initiative) made allegations, among other things of "vandalism".
