= Sing Bing Kang =

American computer scientist

- Education: Carnegie Mellon University
- Known for: Image-based modeling and rendering
- Awards: IEEE Fellow (2012)
- Scientific career
- Fields: Computer vision, computer graphics
- Workplaces: Digital Equipment Corporation Cambridge Research Lab; Microsoft Research; Zillow
- Thesis: Robot Instruction by Human Demonstration (1994)
- Doctoral advisor: Katsushi Ikeuchi

Sing Bing Kang is a computer scientist known for his work in image-based modeling and rendering. He is a distinguished scientist at Zillow.

== Education ==
Kang has a Ph.D. from Carnegie Mellon University, completed in 1994. His dissertation, Robot Instruction by Human Demonstration, was supervised by Katsushi Ikeuchi.

== Сareer ==
In January 1995 he joined the Cambridge Research Laboratory of the Digital Equipment Corporation in Cambridge, Massachusetts, where he wrote an early survey of image-based rendering techniques. He subsequently moved to Microsoft Research in Redmond, Washington, where he was a principal researcher in the Interactive Visual Media group and was among the authors of Holoportation, a real-time three-dimensional telepresence system built for the Microsoft HoloLens.

Kang later joined Zillow, where he worked on on-device panorama stitching for the company's 3D Home tour feature and on the Zillow Indoor Dataset, a collection of more than 70,000 panoramic images of unfurnished homes annotated with room layouts.

== Professional service ==
Kang was program chair of the Asian Conference on Computer Vision in 2007 and of the Conference on Computer Vision and Pattern Recognition in 2009, has served as area chair for the major computer vision conferences and as a papers committee member for SIGGRAPH and SIGGRAPH Asia, and was associate editor-in-chief of IEEE Transactions on Pattern Analysis and Machine Intelligence.

== Awards ==
Kang was named a Fellow of the Institute of Electrical and Electronics Engineers in 2012 for contributions to image-based modeling and rendering.

== Books ==
- Image-Based Rendering (with Heung-Yeung Shum and Shing-Chow Chan, Springer, 2008)
- Image-based Modeling of Plants and Trees (with Long Quan, Morgan & Claypool, 2010)
