= Howie Choset =

American roboticist

- Education: University of Pennsylvania(bachelors degree in 1990) California Institute of Technology (Masters and Ph.D. degrees in 1991 and 1996)
- Alma mater: California Institute of Technology
- Occupations: researcher, academic
- Employer: Carnegie Mellon University's Robotics Institute

Howie Choset is a professor at Carnegie Mellon University's Robotics Institute. His research includes snakebots, or robots designed in a segmented fashion to mimic snake-like actuation and motion, demining, and coverage. His snake robots have also been used in surgical applications for diagnosis and tumor removal; nuclear power plant inspection, archaeological excavations, manufacturing applications and understanding biological behaviors of a variety of animals.

== Education ==
Choset got his undergraduate degrees in computer science and business from the University of Pennsylvania in 1990. He then attended California Institute of Technology, where he got his Masters and Ph.D. degrees in 1991 and 1996 respectively.

== Awards and recognitions ==
In 2002, Choset was named to the MIT Technology Review TR100 as one of the top 100 innovators in the world under the age of 35.

Choset was named Fellow of the Institute of Electrical and Electronics Engineers (IEEE) in 2015.

== Bibliography ==
- Principles of Robot Motion - Theory, Algorithms, and Implementations - co-authored with Wolfram Burgard. MIT Press. ISBN 978-0-262-03327-5.
- Distributed Manipulation by Karl F. Böhringer and Howie Choset (Editors). Springer, 2000. ISBN 978-0-7923-7728-3.
