= Glossary of robotics =

Robotics is the branch of technology that deals with the design, construction, operation, structural disposition, manufacture and application of robots. Robotics is related to the sciences of electronics, engineering, mechanics, and software.

The following is a list of common definitions related to the Robotics field.

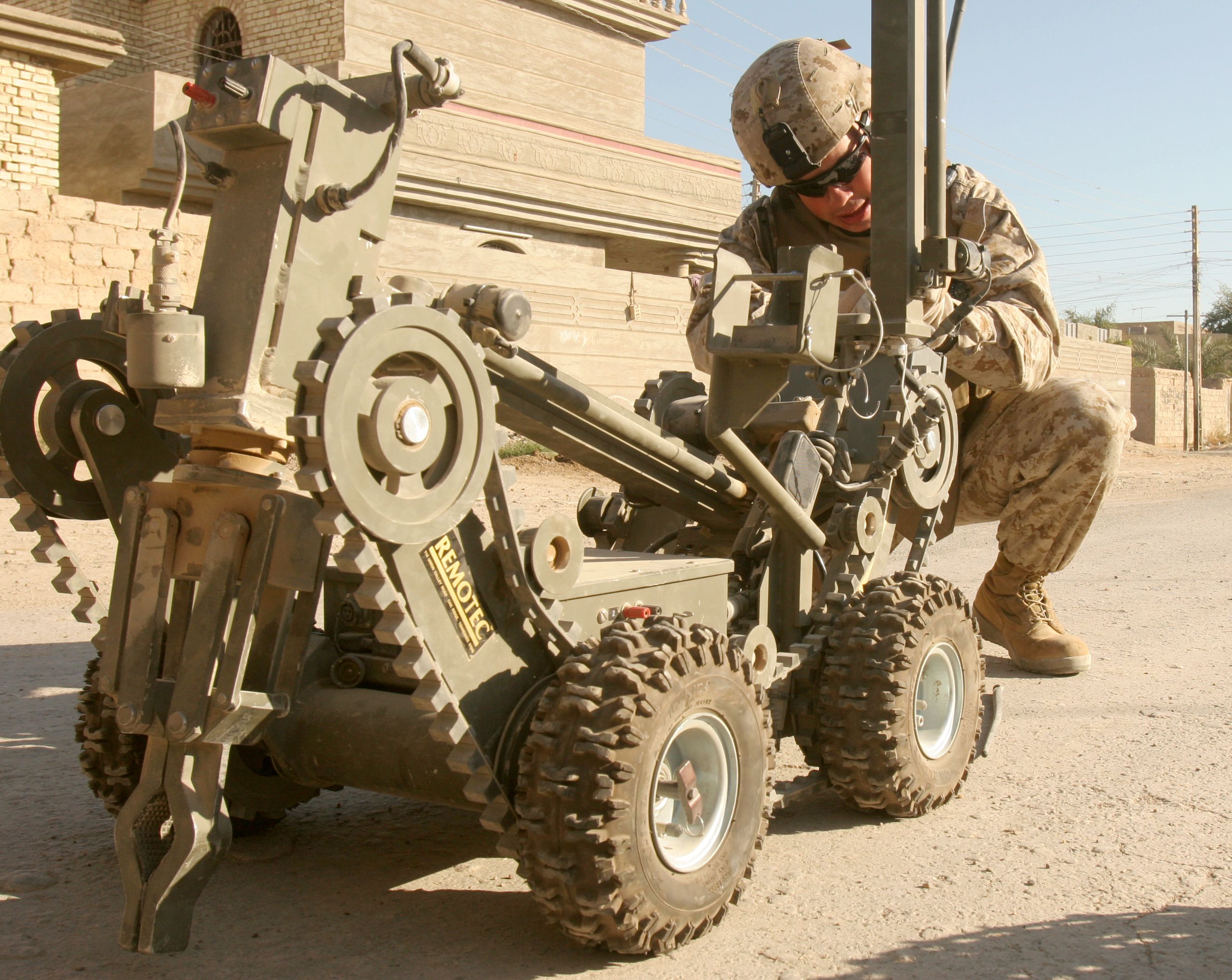
A U.S. Marine Corps technician prepares to deploy a device that will detonate a buried improvised explosive device near Camp Fallujah, Iraq.

== A ==
- Actuator: a motor that translates control signals into mechanical movement. The control signals are usually electrical but may, more rarely, be pneumatic or hydraulic. The power supply may likewise be any of these. It is common for electrical control to be used to modulate a high-power pneumatic or hydraulic motor.
- Aerobot: a robot capable of independent flight on other planets. A type of aerial robot.
- Arduino: The current platform of choice for small-scale robotic experimentation and physical computing.
- Artificial intelligence: is the intelligence of machines and the branch of computer science that aims to create it.
- Aura (satellite): a robotic spacecraft launched by NASA in 2004 which collects atmospheric data from Earth.
- Automaton: an early self-operating robot, performing exactly the same actions, over and over.
- Autonomous vehicle: a vehicle equipped with an autopilot system, which is capable of driving from one point to another without input from a human operator.

== B ==
- Biomimetic: See Bionics.
- Bionics: also known as biomimetics, biognosis, biomimicry, or bionical creativity engineering is the application of biological methods and systems found in nature to the study and design of engineering systems and modern technology.

== C ==
- CAD/CAM (computer-aided design and computer-aided manufacturing): These systems and their data may be integrated into robotic operations.
- Čapek, Karel: Czech author who coined the term 'robot' in his 1921 play, Rossum's Universal Robots.
- Chandra X-ray Observatory: a robotic spacecraft launched by NASA in 1999 to collect astronomical data.
- Cloud robotics: robots empowered with more capacity and intelligence from cloud.
- Combat, robot: a hobby or sport event where two or more robots fight in an arena to disable each other. This has developed from a hobby in the 1990s to several TV series worldwide.
- Cruise missile: a robot-controlled guided missile that carries an explosive payload.
- Cyborg: also known as a cybernetic organism, a being with both biological and artificial (e.g. electronic, mechanical or robotic) parts.

== D ==
- Degrees of freedom: the extent to which a robot can move itself; expressed in terms of Cartesian coordinates (x, y, and z) and angular movements (yaw, pitch, and roll).
- Delta robot: a tripod linkage, used to construct fast-acting manipulators with a wide range of movement.
- Drive Power: The energy source or sources for the robot actuators.

== E ==
- Emergent behaviour, a complicated resultant behaviour that emerges from the repeated operation of simple underlying behaviours.
- Envelope (Space), Maximum The volume of space encompassing the maximum designed movements of all robot parts including the end-effector, workpiece, and attachments.
- Explosive ordnance disposal robot A mobile robot designed to assess whether an object contains explosives; some carry detonators that can be deposited at the object and activated after the robot withdraws.

== F ==
- FIRST(For Inspiration and Recognition of Science and Technology): an organization founded by inventor Dean Kamen in 1989 in order to develop ways to inspire students in engineering and technology fields.
- Forward chaining: a process in which events or received data are considered by an entity to intelligently adapt its behavior.

== G ==
- Gynoid: A humanoid robot designed to look like a human female.

== H ==
- Haptic: tactile feedback technology using the operator's sense of touch. Also sometimes applied to robot manipulators with their own touch sensitivity.
- Hexapod (platform): A movable platform using six linear actuators. Often used in flight simulators and fairground rides, they also have applications as a robotic manipulator.
- Hexapod (walker): A six-legged walking robot, using a simple insect-like locomotion.
- Human–computer interaction.
- Humanoid: A robotic entity designed to resemble a human being in form, function, or both.
- Hydraulics: the control of mechanical force and movement, generated by the application of liquid under pressure. cf. pneumatics.

== I ==
- Industrial robot: A reprogrammable, multifunctional manipulator designed to move material, parts, tools, or specialized devices through variable programmed motions for the performance of a variety of tasks.
- Insect robot: A small robot designed to imitate insect behaviors rather than complex human behaviors.

== K ==
- Kalman filter: a mathematical technique to estimate the value of a sensor measurement, from a series of intermittent and noisy values.
- Kinematics: the study of motion, as applied to robots. This includes both the design of linkages to perform motion, their power, control and stability; also their planning, such as choosing a sequence of movements to achieve a broader task.
- Inverse Kinematics: the process of determining joint angles required for a robot's end-effector to reach a desired position and orientation in space. Used in motion planning to calculate motor commands from target positions.

== L ==
- Linear actuator A form of motor that generates a linear movement directly.

== M ==
- Manipulator or gripper: A robotic 'hand'.
- Mobile robot: A self-propelled and self-contained robot that is capable of moving over a mechanically unconstrained course.
- Muting: The deactivation of a presence-sensing safeguarding device during a portion of the robot cycle.
- Mecanum wheel: A wheel fitted with angled rollers that enables a robot vehicle to move in multiple directions, including sideways.

== O ==
- Ornithopter – An aerial robot or drone that achieves flight through a flapping-wing mechanism rather than rotating blades or fixed wings, often utilized for highly maneuverable flight.

== P ==
- Parallel manipulator: an articulated robot or manipulator based on a number of kinematic chains, actuators and joints, in parallel. cf. serial manipulator.
- Pendant: Any portable control device that permits an operator to control the robot from within the restricted envelope (space) of the robot.
- Pneumatics: the control of mechanical force and movement, generated by the application of compressed gas. cf. hydraulics.
- Powered exoskeleton: is a wearable mobile machine that allow for limb movement with increased strength and endurance.
- Prosthetic robots: programmable manipulators or devices for missing human limbs.

== R ==
- Remote manipulator: A manipulator under direct human control, often used for work with hazardous materials.
- Robonaut: a development project conducted by NASA to create humanoid robots capable of using space tools and working in similar environments to suited astronauts.

== S ==
- Sensor fusion:The process of combining data from multiple sensors, such as LiDAR, cameras, global positioning systems (GPS), and inertial measurement units (IMUs), to produce a more accurate and reliable understanding of an environment than using a single sensor alone. It is widely used in robotics and autonomous systems to improve perception, localization, and decision-making.
- Serial manipulator: an articulated robot or manipulator with a single series kinematic chain of actuators. cf. parallel manipulator.
- Service robots are machines that extend human capabilities.
- Servo, a motor that moves to and maintains a set position under command, rather than continuously moving.
- Servomechanism An automatic device that uses error-sensing negative feedback to correct the performance of a mechanism.
- Single Point of Control The ability to operate the robot such that initiation or robot motion from one source of control is possible only from that source and cannot be overridden from another source.
- Slow Speed Control A mode of robot motion control where the velocity of the robot is limited to allow persons sufficient time either to withdraw the hazardous motion or stop the robot.
- Snake robot A robot component resembling a tentacle or elephant's trunk, where many small actuators are used to allow continuous curved motion of a robot component, with many degrees of freedom. This is usually applied to snake-arm robots, which use this as a flexible manipulator. A rarer application is the snakebot, where the entire robot is mobile and snake-like, so as to gain access through narrow spaces.
- Stepper motor
- Stewart platform A movable platform using six linear actuators, hence also known as a Hexapod.
- Subsumption architecture A robot architecture that uses a modular, bottom-up design beginning with the least complex behavioral tasks.
- Surgical robot, a remote manipulator used for keyhole surgery
- Swarm robotics involve large numbers of mostly simple physical robots. Their actions may seek to incorporate emergent behavior observed in social insects (swarm intelligence).
- Synchro

== T ==
- Teach Mode: The control state that allows the generation and storage of positional data points effected by moving the robot arm through a path of intended motions.
- Three Laws of Robotics, coined by the science fiction author Isaac Asimov, one of the first serious considerations of the ethics and robopsychological aspects of robotics.
- Tool Center Point (TCP) The origin of the tool coordinate system.

== U ==
- Uncanny valley A hypothesized zone in which humanoid robot behavior and appearance begin to approach that of actual humans, but are still missing vital elements, to the point that these mimicked actions or images cause revulsion.
- Unimate, the first off-the-shelf industrial robot, of 1961.

== W ==
- Waldo, a short story by Robert Heinlein, that gave its name to a popular nickname for remote manipulators.
- Walking robot, a robot capable of locomotion by walking. Owing to the difficulties of balance, two-legged walking robots have so far been rare and most walking robots have used insect-like multilegged walking gaits.

== Z ==
- Zero Moment Point. Zero Moment Point is a concept related with dynamics and control of legged locomotion, e.g., for humanoid robots. It specifies the point with respect to which dynamic reaction force at the contact of the foot with the ground does not produce any moment, i.e. the point where total inertia force equals 0 (zero).
- ZMP. See Zero Moment Point.

== See also ==
- Outline of robotics
- Index of robotics articles
- Artificial intelligence
- Glossary of artificial intelligence
