= Cartesian parallel manipulators =

In robotics, Cartesian parallel manipulators are manipulators that move a platform using parallel-connected kinematic linkages ('limbs') lined up with a Cartesian coordinate system. Multiple limbs connect the moving platform to a base. Each limb is driven by a linear actuator and the linear actuators are mutually perpendicular. The term 'parallel' here refers to the way that the kinematic linkages are put together, it does not connote geometrically parallel; i.e., equidistant lines.

== Context ==
Generally, manipulators (also called 'robots' or 'mechanisms') are mechanical devices that position and orientate objects. The position of an object in three-dimensional (3D) space can be specified by three numbers X, Y, Z known as 'coordinates.' In a Cartesian coordinate system (named after René Descartes who introduced analytic geometry, the mathematical basis for controlling manipulators) the coordinates specify distances from three mutually perpendicular reference planes. The orientation of an object in 3D can be specified by three additional numbers corresponding to the orientation angles. The first manipulators were developed after World War II for the Argonne National Laboratory to safely handle highly radioactive material remotely. The first numerically controlled manipulators (NC machines) were developed by Parsons Corp. and the MIT Servomechanisms Laboratory, for milling applications. These machines position a cutting tool relative to a Cartesian coordinate system using three mutually perpendicular linear actuators (prismatic P joints), with (PP)P joint topology. The first industrial robot, Unimate, was invented in the 1950s. Its control axes correspond to a spherical coordinate system, with RRP joint topology composed of two revolute R joints in series with a prismatic P joint. Most industrial robots today are articulated robots composed of a serial chain of revolute R joints RRRRRR.

== Description ==
Cartesian parallel manipulators are in the intersection of two broader categories of manipulators: Cartesian and parallel. Cartesian manipulators are driven by mutually perpendicular linear actuators. They generally have a one-to-one correspondence between the linear positions of the actuators and the X, Y, Z position coordinates of the moving platform, making them easy to control. Furthermore, Cartesian manipulators do not change the orientation of the moving platform. Most commonly, Cartesian manipulators are serial-connected; i.e., they consist of a single kinematic linkage chain, i.e. the first linear actuator moves the second one and so on. On the other hand, Cartesian parallel manipulators are parallel-connected, i.e. they consist of multiple kinematic linkages. Parallel-connected manipulators have innate advantages in terms of stiffness, precision, dynamic performance and in supporting heavy loads.

== Configurations ==
Various types of Cartesian parallel manipulators are summarized here. Only fully parallel-connected mechanisms are included; i.e., those having the same number of limbs as degrees of freedom of the moving-platform, with a single actuator per limb.

=== Multipteron family ===
Members of the Multipteron family of manipulators have either 3, 4, 5 or 6 degrees of freedom (DoF). The Tripteron 3-DoF member has three translation degrees of freedom 3T DoF, with the subsequent members of the Multipteron family each adding a rotational R degree of freedom. Each member of the family has mutually perpendicular linear actuators connected to a fixed base. The moving platform is typically attached to the linear actuators through three geometrically parallel revolute R joints. See Kinematic pair for a description of shorthand joint notation used to describe manipulator configurations, like revolute R joint for example.

==== Tripteron ====
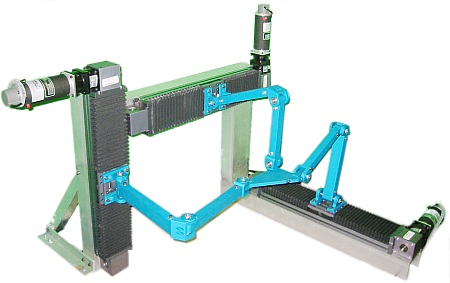
Tripteron

The 3-DoF Tripteron member of the Multipteron family has three parallel-connected kinematic chains consisting of a linear actuator (active prismatic P joint) in series with three revolute R joints 3(PRRR). Similar manipulators, with three parallelogram Pa limbs 3(PRPaR) are the Orthoglide and Parallel cube-manipulator. The Pantepteron is also similar to the Tripteron, with pantograph linkages to speed up the motion of the platform.

==== Qudrupteron ====
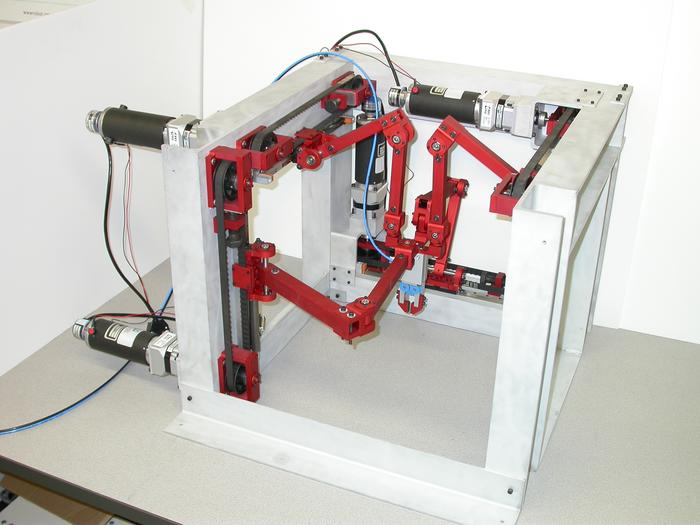
Quadrupteron

The 4-DoF Qudrupteron has 3T1R DoF with (3PRRU)(PRRR) joint topology.

==== Pentapteron ====
The 5-DoF Pentateron has 3T2R DoF with 5(PRRRR) joint topology.

==== Hexapteron ====
The 6-DoF Hexapteron has 3T3R DoF with 6(PCRS) joint topology, with cylindrical C and spherical S joints.

=== Isoglide ===
The Isoglide family includes many different Cartesian parallel manipulators from 2-6 DoF.

=== Xactuator ===
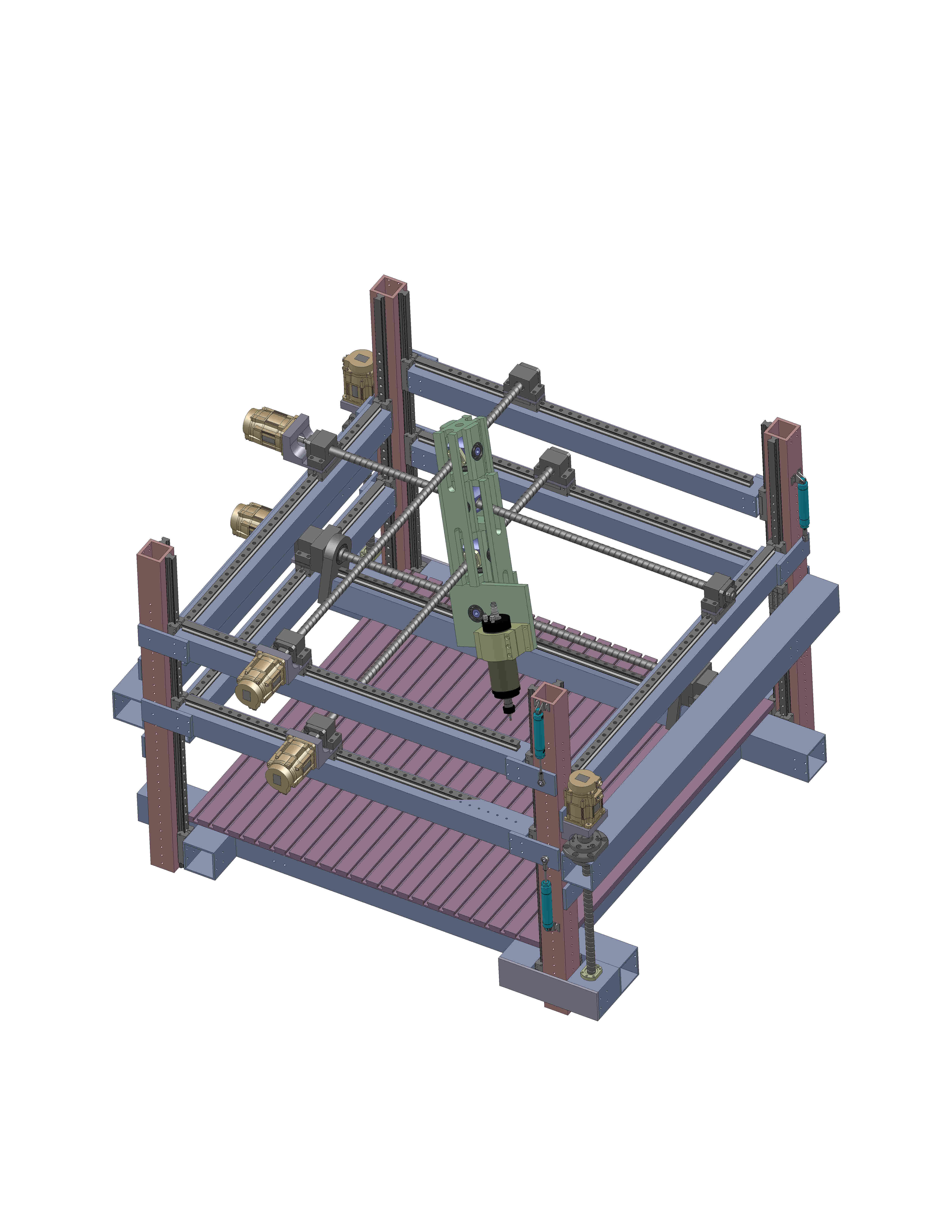
Xactuator

The 4-DoF or 5-DoF Coupled Cartesian manipulators family are gantry type Cartesian parallel manipulators with 2T2R DoF or 3T2R DoF.
