= Large workspace robot =

A large workspace robot (LWR) is a robot that is defined by especially large workspaces compared to certain characteristics like weight (or mass), or bulk size of the robot itself.

== Definition ==
The size of the workspace of a robot is, in general, proportional to the mass of the robot, or to its size. This means that the notion of LWR can be defined only relative to some other feature of the system.

=== Weight-based ===
For example, considering a robot of mass m and a workspace volume W the adimensional quantity β (from the Greek word for "weight", βάρος) can be defined as:

$\beta=\frac{W}{m}$	1

Upon preliminary examination of the panorama of industrial robots, it was shown that a good threshold for this parameter is $\beta=0.2$. Indeed, in the case where $\beta\geq0.2$, the robot can be considered as a LWR. The vast majority of industrial serial and parallel manipulators fall into the category where $\beta<0.2$.

=== Bulk-based ===
A different approach in defining LWRs is through the bulk size of the robot. The dimensionless quantity δ can be defined as:

$\delta=\frac{W}{D_{max}}$	2

The bulk-based definition is less general, and depends strongly on how it is implemented. Specifically, the definition of D_{max} is non-obvious; for example, if a deployable robot is taken into consideration, D_{max} can be thought of either the maximum dimension of the stored configuration of the robot, or as the maximum dimension of the deployed configuration.

== Examples ==
The most widely known example of Large Workspace Robot is called Cable Driven Parallel Manipulator (CDPR), or Cable Direct Driven Manipulator (CDDR). This kind of robots takes advantage of cables, winded on computer-controlled winches, to maneuver the end-effector.

By keeping the cables taut either simply by exploiting the force of gravity, or using complex over-actuated systems, the robot can reach very large workspaces while keeping its mass to modest values. Indeed, while it is true that in order to double the size of the workspace, the cables' length should double as well, the large part of the mass of the robot lies in the winches, pulleys and the end-effector; the influence of the cable length is only mildly influential to these components.

Another example of LWR is an uncrewed vehicle, a rover or the more general mobile robot. The workspace of this kind of robots can be considered unlimited, albeit only bi-dimensional and constrained by the ground shape. This means that, from Eq. 1, $\beta\rightarrow\infty$; the same is true for the bulk-based parameter $\delta$.
