= Five-bar linkage =

2-DoF mechanism with 5 links and 5 joints

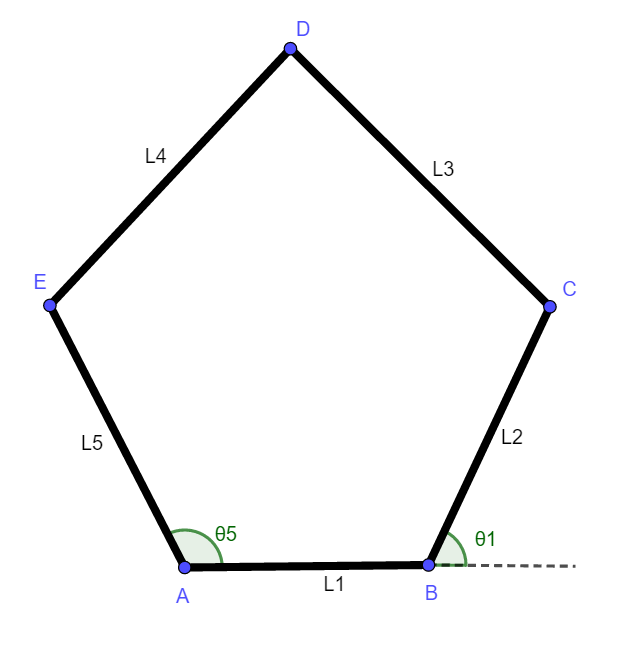
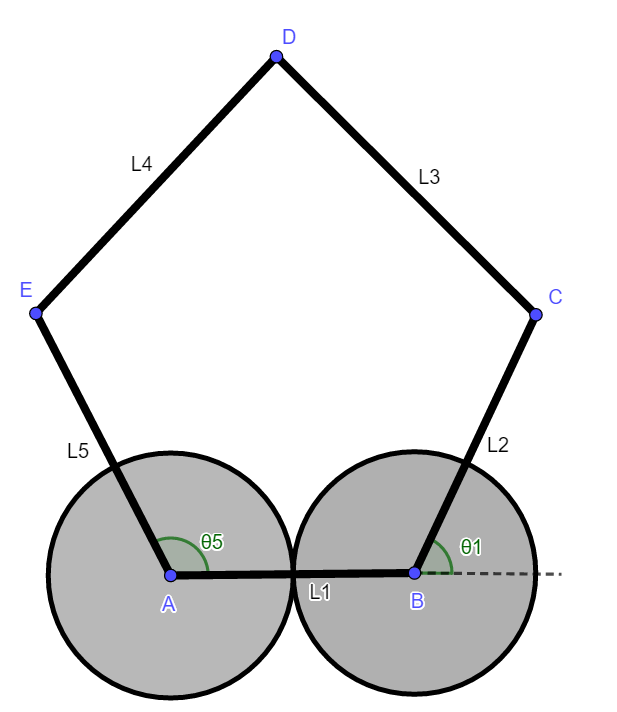
2 DOF five-bar mechanism with two input angles θ_{1} and θ_{2} and a geared mechanism, where the two disks represent meshing gears which are fixed to their corresponding links

In kinematics, a five-bar linkage is a mechanism with two degrees of freedom that is constructed from five links that are connected together in a closed chain. All links are connected to each other by five joints in series forming a loop. One of the links is the ground or base. This configuration is also called a pantograph, however, it is not to be confused with the parallelogram-copying linkage pantograph.

The linkage can be a one-degree-of-freedom mechanism if two gears are attached to two links and are meshed together, forming a geared five-bar mechanism.

Animation of a five-bar mechanism angle sweep over its workspace, done on MATLAB. The red arrow indicates the velocity direction of the end-effector due to unit speed input at the left motor and its length is proportional to its speed.

== Robotic configuration ==
When controlled motors actuate the linkage, the whole system (a mechanism and its actuators) becomes a robot. This is usually done by placing two servomotors (to control the two degrees of freedom) at the joints A and B, controlling the angle of the links L2 and L5. L1 is the grounded link. In this configuration, the controlled endpoint or end-effector is the point D, where the objective is to control its x and y coordinates in the plane in which the linkage resides. The angles theta 1 and theta 2 can be calculated as a function of the x,y coordinates of point D using trigonometric functions. This robotic configuration is a parallel manipulator. It is a parallel configuration robot as it is composed of two controlled serial manipulators connected to the endpoint.

Unlike a serial manipulator, this configuration has the advantage of having both motors grounded at the base link. As the motor can be quite massive, this significantly decreases the total moment of inertia of the linkage and improves backdrivability for haptic feedback applications. On the other hand, workspace reached by the endpoint is usually significantly smaller than that of a serial manipulator.

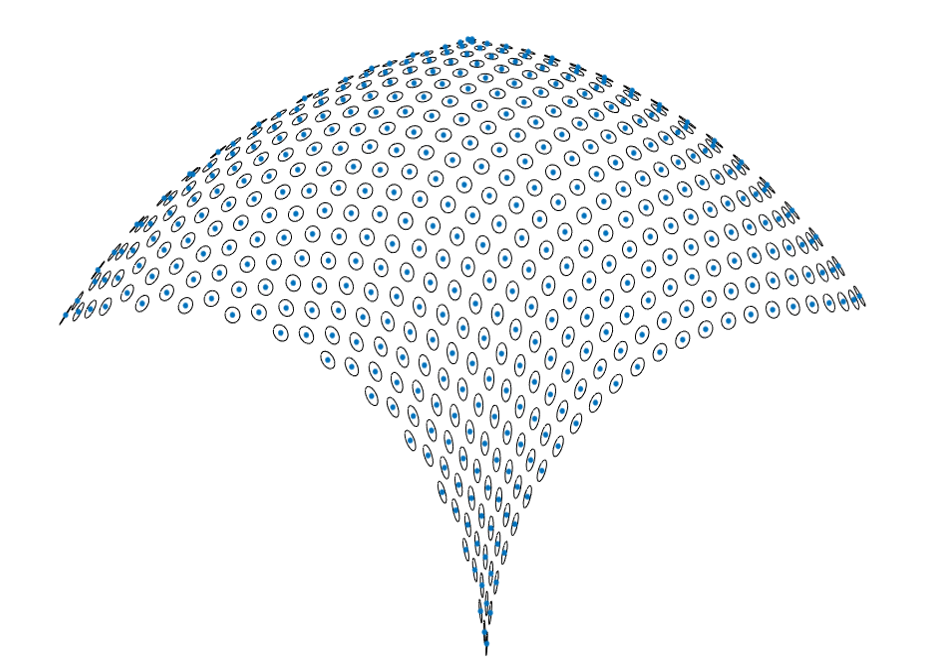
Velocity ellipses of a five-bar linkage robot.

=== Kinematics and dynamics ===
Both the forward and inverse kinematics of this robotic configuration can be found in closed-form equations through geometric relationships. Different methods of finding both have been done by Campion and Hayward. Dynamic modeling of this robotic configuration has been done by Khalil and Abu Seif, forming an equations of motion relating the torques applied at motor with the angles at the joints. The model assumes all links are rigid with center of gravity at their centers, and zero-stiffness at all joints.

== Applications ==
This robotic linkage is used in many different fields ranging from prosthetics to haptic feedback. This design has been explored in several haptic feedback devices for general force feedback. It has also been used in the automatic drawing toy WeDraw. A novel Ackermann-type steering mechanism design by Zhao et al. utilized a five-bar linkage instead of the regular four-bar linkage. A prosthetic ankle-foot by Dong et al. used a geared five-bar spring mechanism to simulate the stiffness and damping behavior of a real foot.
