= Reymond Clavel =

Swiss roboticist

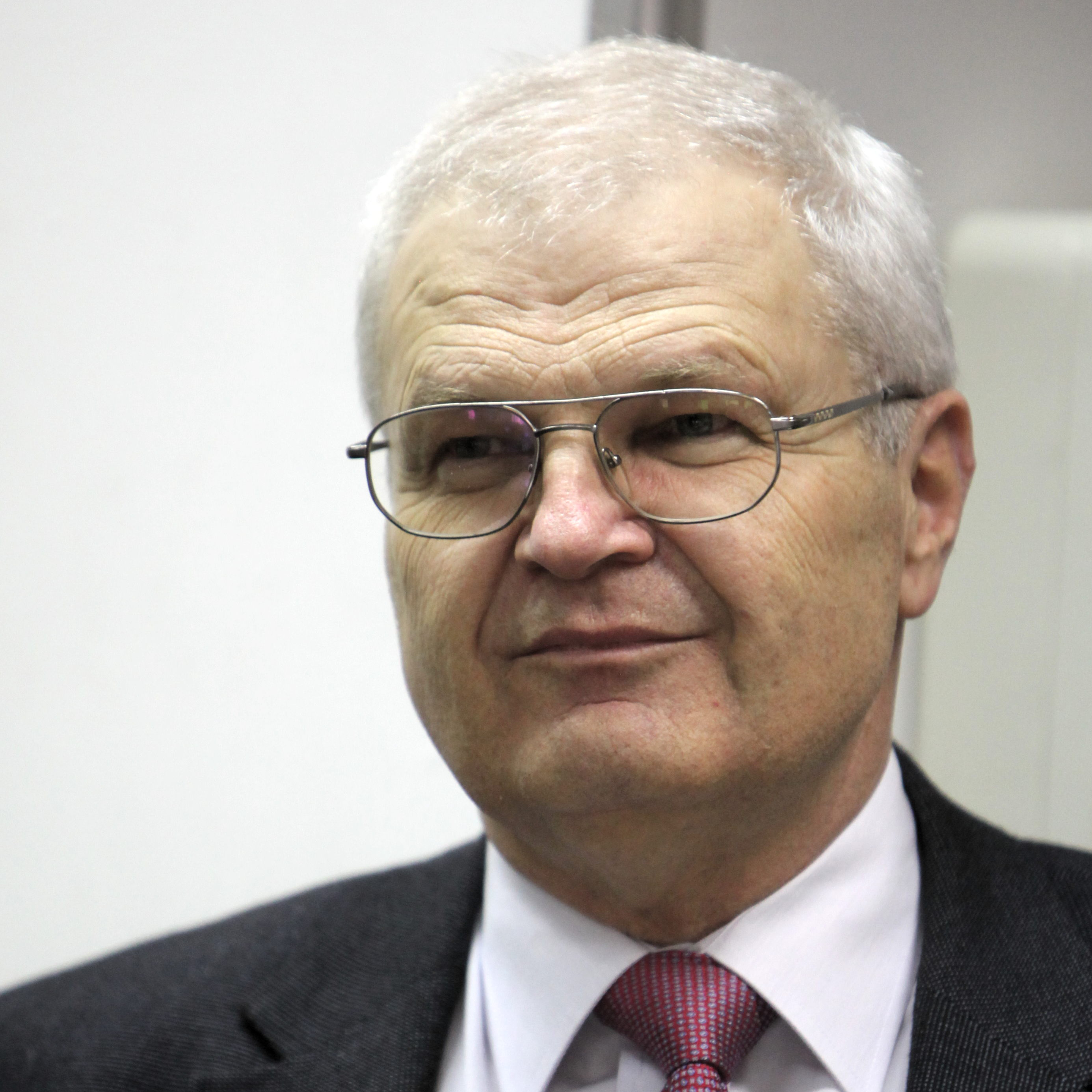
- Born: 1950-06-23; Oulens-sous-Echallens (Switzerland)
- Died: 2025-06-24
- Education: École Polytechnique Fédérale de Lausanne
- Known for: Delta robot
- Awards: JIRA AWARD (1989)
- Scientific career
- Fields: robotics, micro-robotics and high precision mechanisms.
- Workplaces: École Polytechnique Fédérale de Lausanne
- Doctoral advisor: Professor Christof Burckhardt

Reymond Clavel (23 June 1950 – 24 June 2025) was a Swiss roboticist and professor at the École Polytechnique Fédérale de Lausanne (EPFL) in Switzerland. He is one of the pioneers in the development of parallel robots, and the inventor of the notable Delta robot. Clavel’s research in robotics, particularly in parallel and high-precision mechanisms, helped pioneer the field of parallel robotics in the 1980s and led to numerous practical applications and awards.

== Early life and education ==
Reymond Clavel was born on 23 June 1950 in Oulens-sous-Échallens, Switzerland. He studied mechanical engineering at EPFL and obtained his engineering degree (Diplôme) in 1973. After graduation, Clavel spent over eight years in industry working in research and development at Hermes Precisa International in Yverdon-les-Bains.

== Academic career and the Delta robot ==
In 1981, Clavel returned to EPFL as a faculty member, initially as an assistant professor. He later earned his Ph.D. in parallel robotics in 1991, with a dissertation based on the development of a novel parallel robot. Clavel was promoted to full professor of microengineering in 1993 and that same year became director of EPFL’s Laboratoire de Systèmes Robotiques (LSRO, later known as LSRO2). He served as a professor at EPFL until his retirement in 2013, when he delivered his honorary lecture and was named Professor Emeritus.

Clavel’s most significant contribution to robotics was the invention of the Delta robot in the early 1980s. In 1985, he led the research team that built the first working Delta parallel robot, which featured three lightweight arms connected to a mobile platform (end-effector). The design enabled extremely high-speed and precise manipulation of small, light objects, addressing an industrial need for rapid packaging automation. Clavel was inspired to create the Delta robot after observing manual chocolate packing in a Swiss factory and seeking to alleviate repetitive labor through automation. The Delta robot was patented in 1985, and in 1987 a Swiss company, Demaurex (founded by Clavel’s classmate Marc-Olivier Demaurex), licensed the design to produce Delta robots for the packaging industry. The introduction of the Delta robot revolutionized high-speed pick-and-place operations, offering accelerations up to 50g, and it has since been widely adopted in diverse sectors including food and pharmaceutical packaging, electronics assembly, and even surgical robotics. Over 10,000 Delta robots were estimated to be in use worldwide by the 21st century, spawning many variations in size and application (from large payload models to micron-scale devices).

Beyond the Delta robot, Clavel’s research interests included parallel kinematics mechanisms, high-dynamics robotics, medical and surgical robots, haptic interfaces, and precision mechanisms. He headed the EPFL Institute of Microengineering (as department head from 1991 to 1993) and served multiple terms as Director of the Microengineering Section at EPFL, contributing to academic administration in addition to research. Clavel was also a dedicated educator, known for mentoring dozens of graduate students (supervising over 30 doctoral theses) and maintaining close ties with industry through collaborative projects and startup initiatives. Over the course of his career, he was credited as an inventor on roughly 30 patents related to robotic mechanisms and devices.

== Awards ==
- 1989 – Laureate of the Japan Industrial Robot Association (JIRA) Award for the invention of the Delta parallel robot.
- 1996 – Winner of the Technologiestandort Schweiz competition, receiving the ABB Sonderpreis (special prize) for the best robotics project.
- 1998 – Grand Prix de l’Innovation in Monaco awarded to his laboratory for advances in new robot technologies.
- 1999 – Golden Robot Award (sponsored by ABB) for the Delta robot, recognizing its impact on industrial robotics.
- 2003 – Three of Clavel’s research projects each won a Swiss Technology Award (multiple winners in one year).
- 2005 – Winner of the Swiss Technology Award, along with the Fondation Vontobel Special Prize (“Sonderpreis”) for Inventing the Future (awarded for his lab’s innovative developments).
- 2006 – Winner of the Swiss Technology Award for the project “Quantum Leap into the World of Nano-EDM,” a high-precision electrical discharge machining system based on Delta robot kinematics.
- 2007 – Two projects from Clavel’s lab won Swiss Technology Awards: “Cyberthosis for paraplegia rehabilitation” (a robotic rehabilitation device, in collaboration with Swortec and the Fondation Suisse pour les Cyberthèses) and the “Microfactory” (a miniature manufacturing system developed with CSEM).
- 2024 – Joseph F. Engelberger Robotics Award, the world’s most prestigious robotics honor, awarded by the Association for Advancing Automation (A3) for Clavel’s pioneering role in developing the Delta robot.
