= Machine Men =

Machine Men may refer to:

- Machine Men (toy), also known as Machine Robo
- Machine Men (band), a Finnish heavy metal band 1998–2011
- Machine Man, a fictional android superhero appearing in Marvel Comics
- Machine Man (novel), a 2011 novel written by Max Barry
- Machineman, a character in the Japanese television show Nebula Mask Machineman

== See also ==
- Man-Machine (disambiguation)
