= Discovery ROUV =

Unmanned underwater vehicle

History

PRC
- Name: Discovery
- Ordered: 1
- Awarded: 1
- Builder: Specialist Machine Development (SMD) Ltd
- Christened: 2014
- Completed: 2014
- Acquired: 2014
- Commissioned: 2021
- Maiden voyage: 2014
- In service: 2014
- Refit: 2018
- Reinstated: 2019
- Status: Active

Class overview
- Operators: People's Liberation Army Navy
- Built: 2014
- In service: 2014 onward
- In commission: 2014 onward
- Planned: 1
- Completed: 1
- Active: 1

General characteristics
- Type: ROUV
- Length: 3 m (9 ft 10 in)
- Beam: 1.7 m (5 ft 7 in)
- Height: 2 m (6 ft 7 in)
- Sensors & processing systems: Various
- Electronic warfare & decoys: None
- Armament: None
- Armour: None
- Aircraft carried: None
- Aviation facilities: None

Discovery (Fa-xian, 发现 in Chinese) remotely operated underwater vehicle (ROUV) is a type of very little known unmanned underwater vehicle (UUV) originally built in Great Britain by British firm Specialist Machine Development (SMD) Limited for the People's Republic of China (PRC). and the British firm was later purchased by CSR Corporation Limited in April 2015.

== Equipment ==
In order to complete its assigned missions, Discovery ROUV is equipped with seven underwater cameras, two high definition cameras, underwater positioning system, one Titan 4 and one Atlas manipulators, each is capable of handling objects weighing up to 120 kg, and when used together, objects weighing up to 300 kg can be handled. In addition, there are more than thirty different kinds of scientific instruments and equipment indigenously developed in China for the ROUV after it entered service.

== Specification ==
- Length: 3 meter
- Width: 1.7 meter
- Height: 2 meter
- Payload: 300 kg
- Maximum operating depth: 6000 meter

== Upgrade ==
Merely less than half a decade after entering service, Discovery ROV went through an upgrade that lasted more than half a year in China, from end of October 2018 thru April 2019. It's reported that during this maintenance/upgrade, by incorporating more advanced technologies, the maximum operating depth is increased by a third, to the original 4,500 meters to 6,000 meter after Discovery ROV returned to service. The mothership of Discovery ROUV has been Chinese research ship Science (Ke-Xue, 科学) since the ROUV first entered service in 2014.
