= Pocketdelta robot =

Type of microrobot

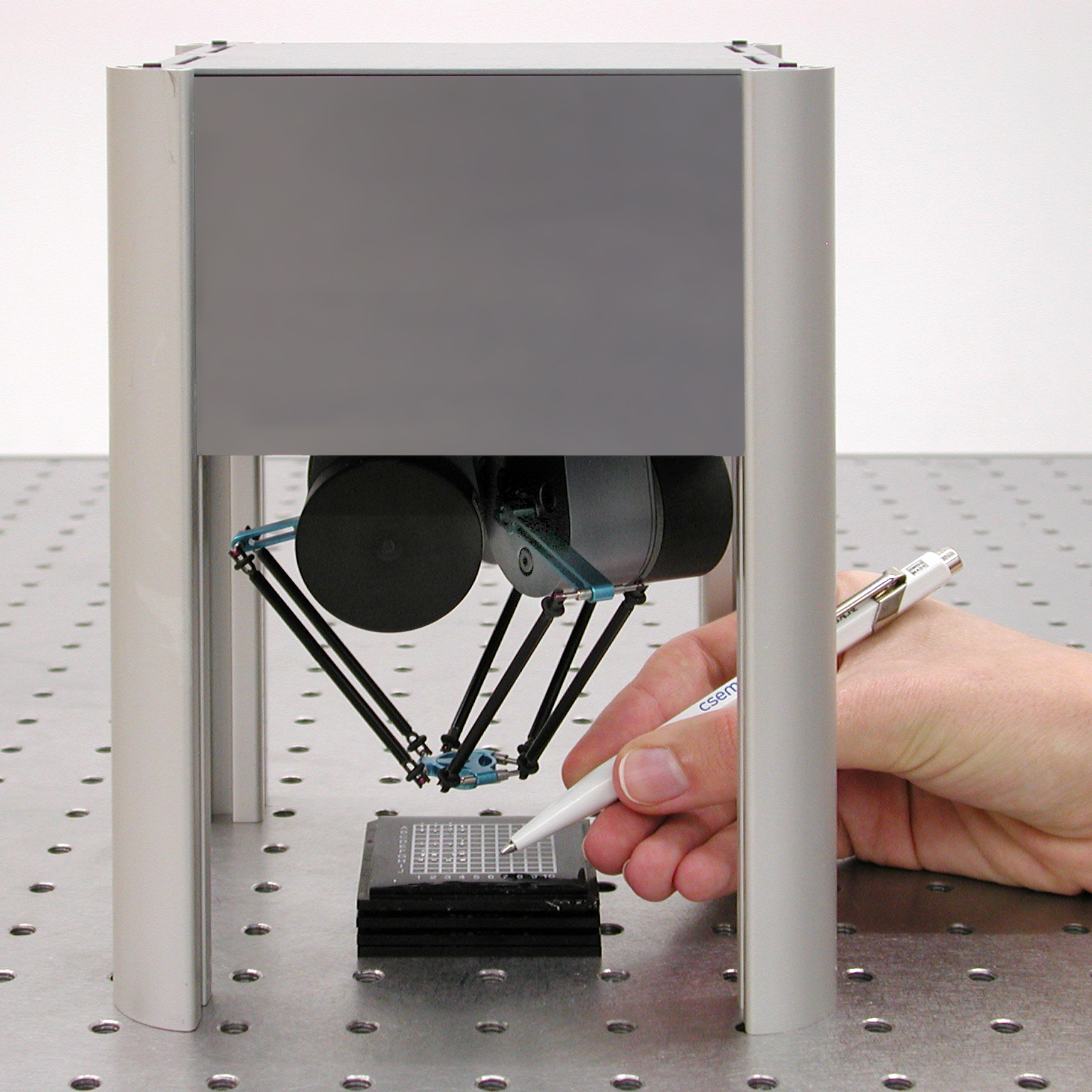
Picture of the PocketDelta robot

The PocketDelta Robot is a microrobot based on a parallel structure called "Delta robot". It has been designed to perform micro-assembly tasks where high-speed and high-precision are needed in a reduced working space. The robot's size is 120×120×200 mm offering a workspace diameter up to 150mm × 30mm.

== Design ==
Prerequisites to high-speed and high-precision are a light, but stiff mechanical structure. Thus stiff and lightweight materials build up the moving part of the robot, whereas the heavy motors are attached to the supporting frame. The motors are attached directly to the robot arm (direct drive), eliminating backlash, friction and elasticity.

A high-level of integration reduces the size of the whole system. The mechanics, motion drives, control electronics and computing are all integrated into one compact unit. This innovative configuration simplifies its use and increases the flexibility of the robot.

The controller is based on PC architecture with interface boards for communication with the robot hardware. The realtime software enables the generation of trajectories in the Cartesian space using a direct and inverse kinematics model of the robot.

The robot integrates a web server which enables an easy communication through an Ethernet network using HTTP, TCP or UDP protocol.

== History ==
- 2004: The first prototype is developed at the microRobotics Lab of the Bern University of Applied Sciences in Biel (CH) as a part of a new project on "Microfactory"'s topic launched by the CSEM SA (CH) in collaboration with the EPFL (CH)
- 2005: CSEM SA develops a new version of the robot and introduces it as the "world's smallest Delta robot"
- March 2007: CSEM's «Smallest Format Factory» and PocketDelta robot win the Swiss Technology Award and are nominated for the Hermes Award
- 2007: The company Asyril SA was founded as a spin-off company from CSEM. The company developed the current version of the PocketDelta robot together with its sister company CPAutomation SA and has been commercializing the robot as a tool for highly precise micro-mechanical manipulation as well as flexible part feeding systems.

== Applications ==
Typical application's domains for the PocketDelta robot are the following:

- Watch and precision mechanics
- Assembly of medical devices
- Surface mount technology, semiconductor and electronic parts assembly
- MEMS and MOEMS
- System in package (SIP)
- Biochips
