= Delta robot =

Device for manipulating an end effector

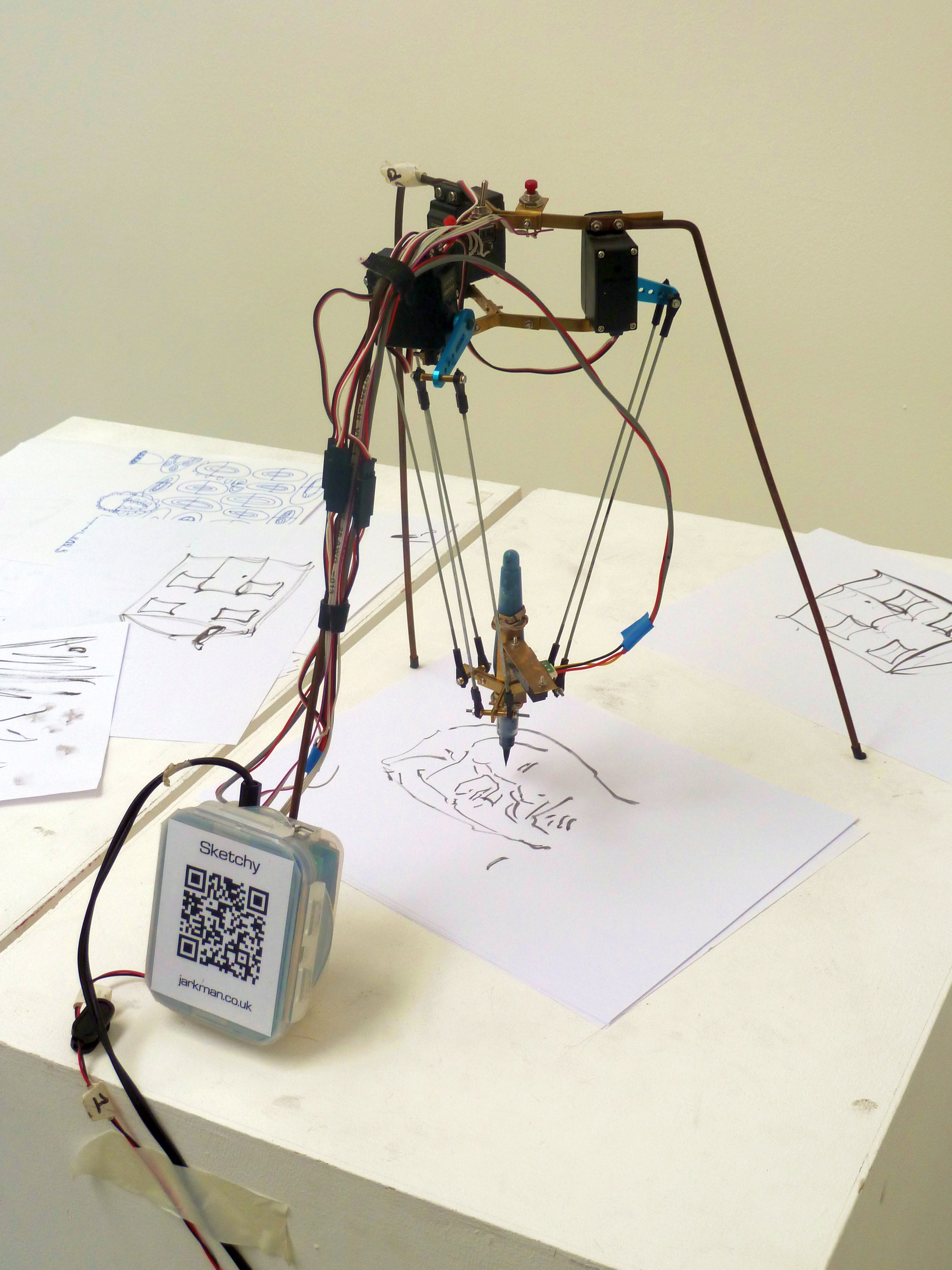
Sketchy, a portrait-drawing delta robot

A delta robot is a type of parallel robot that consists of three arms connected to universal joints at the base. The key design feature is the use of parallelograms in the arms, which maintains the orientation of the end effector. In contrast, a Stewart platform can change the orientation of its end effector.

Delta robots have popular usage in picking and packaging in factories because they can be quite fast, some executing up to 300 picks per minute.

== History ==
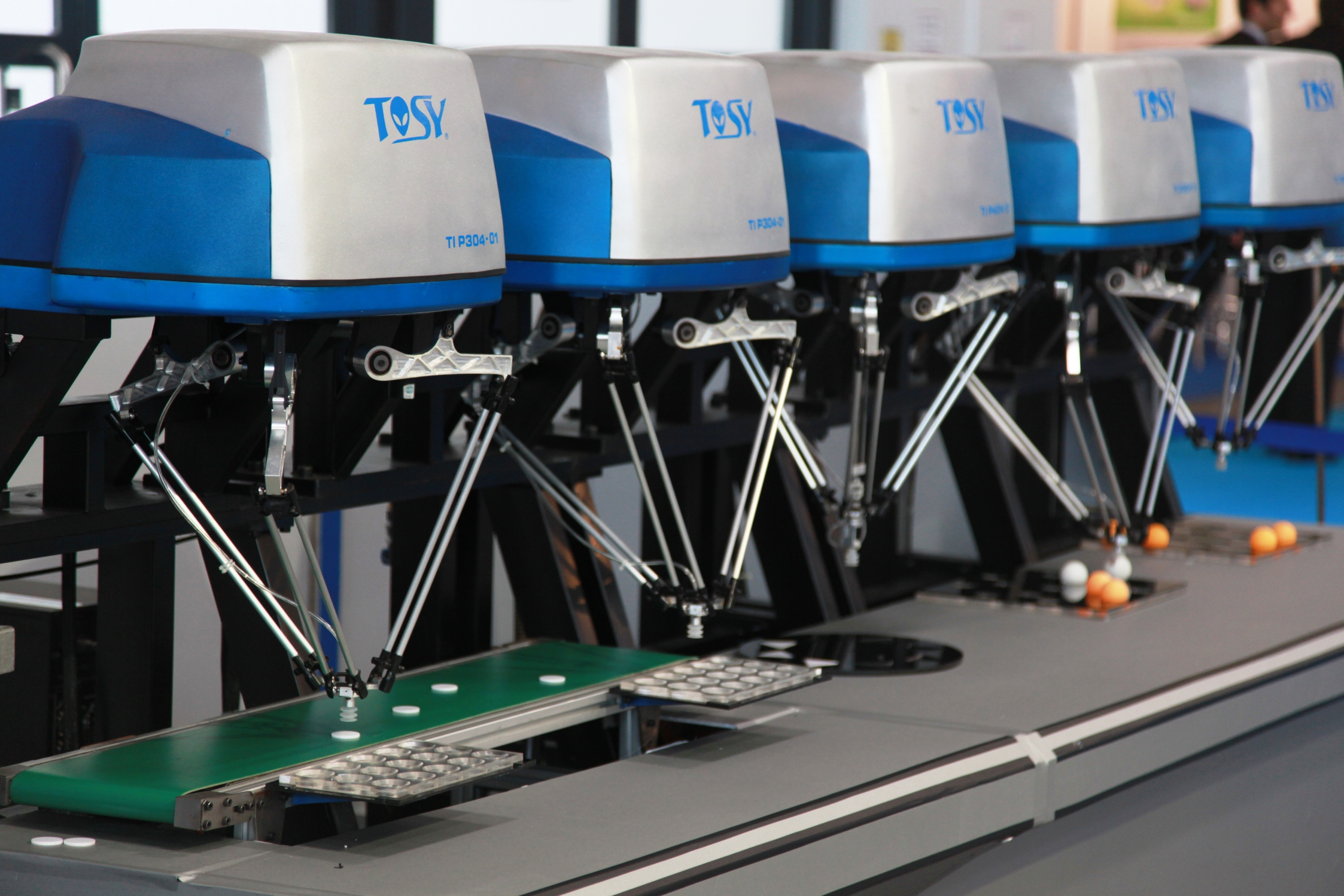
Commercial pick and place robots

The delta robot (a parallel arm robot) was invented in the early 1980s by a research team led by professor Reymond Clavel at the École Polytechnique Fédérale de Lausanne (EPFL, Switzerland). After a visit to a chocolate maker, a team member wanted to develop a robot to place pralines in their packages. The purpose of this new type of robot was to manipulate light and small objects at a very high speed, an industrial need at that time.

In 1987, the Swiss company Demaurex purchased a license for the delta robot and started the production of delta robots for the packaging industry.

In 1991, Reymond Clavel presented his doctoral thesis, 'Conception d'un robot parallèle rapide à 4 degrés de liberté', and received the golden robot award in 1999 for his work and development of the delta robot.

Also in 1999, ABB Flexible Automation started selling its delta robot, the FlexPicker. By the end of 1999, delta robots were also sold by Sigpack Systems.

In 2017, researchers from Harvard's Microrobotics Lab miniaturized it with piezoelectric actuators to 0.43 grams for 15 mm x 15 mm x 20 mm, capable of moving a 1.3 g payload around a 7 cubic millimeter workspace with a 5 micrometers precision, reaching 0.45 m/s speeds with 215 m/s² accelerations and repeating patterns at 75 Hz.

== Design ==
Delta robot kinematics (green arms are fixed length, at 90° to their blue axis that they rotate about)

The delta robot is a parallel robot, i.e., it consists of multiple kinematic chains connecting the base with the end-effector. The robot can also be seen as a spatial generalisation of a four-bar linkage.

The key concept of the delta robot is the use of parallelograms which restrict the movement of the end platform to pure translation, i.e., only movement in the X, Y or Z direction with no rotation.

The robot's base is mounted above the workspace and all the actuators are located on it. From the base, three middle jointed arms extend. The ends of these arms are connected to a small triangular platform. Actuation of the input links will move the triangular platform along the X, Y or Z direction. Actuation can be done with linear or rotational actuators, with or without reductions (direct drive).

Since the actuators are all located in the base, the arms can be made of a light composite material. As a result of this, the moving parts of the delta robot have a small inertia. This allows for very high speed and high accelerations. Having all the arms connected together to the end-effector increases the robot stiffness, but reduces its working volume.

The version developed by Reymond Clavel has four degrees of freedom: three translations and one rotation. In this case a fourth leg extends from the base to the middle of the triangular platform giving to the end effector a fourth, rotational degree of freedom around the vertical axis.

Currently other versions of the delta robot have been developed:

- Delta with 6 degrees of freedom: developed by the Fanuc company, in this robot a serial kinematic with 3 rotational degrees of freedom is placed on the end effector
- Delta with 4 degrees of freedom: developed by the Adept company, this robot has 4 parallelogram directly connected to the end-platform instead of having a fourth leg coming in the middle of the end-effector
- Pocketdelta: developed by the Swiss company Asyril SA, a 3-axis version of the delta robot adapted for flexible part feeding systems and other high-speed, high-precision applications.
- Delta direct drive: a 3 degrees of freedom delta robot having the motor directly connected to the arms. Accelerations can be very high, from 30 up to 100 g.
- Delta cube: developed by the EPFL university laboratory LSRO, a delta robot built in a monolithic design, having flexure-hinges joints. This robot is adapted for ultra-high-precision applications.
- Several "linear delta" arrangements have been developed where the motors drive linear actuators rather than rotating an arm. Such linear delta arrangements can have much larger working volumes than rotational delta arrangements.

The majority of delta robots use rotary actuators. Vertical linear actuators have recently been used (using a linear delta design) to produce a novel design of 3D printer. These offer advantages over conventional leadscrew-based 3D printers of quicker access to a larger build volume for a comparable investment in hardware.

== Applications ==
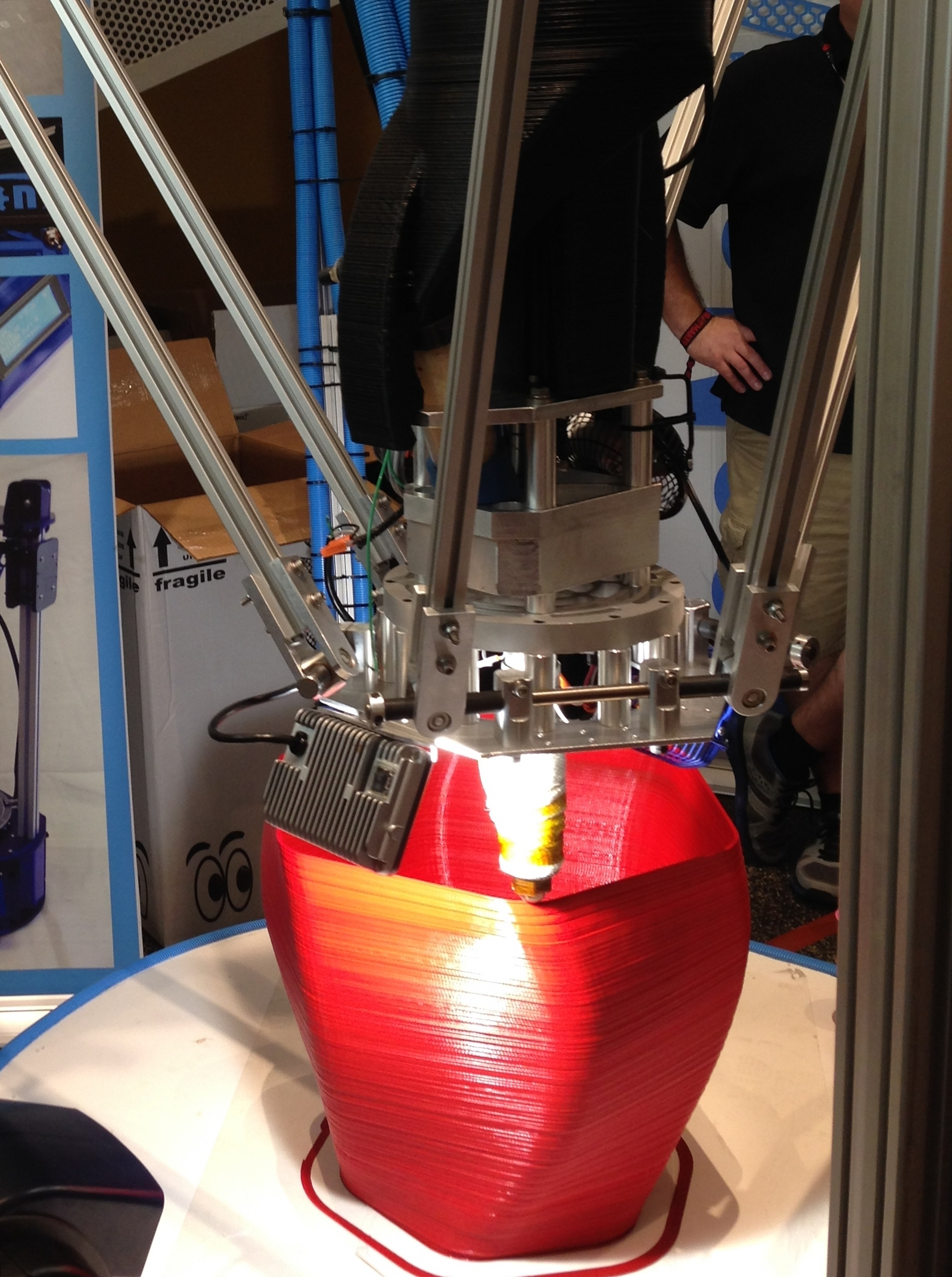
Large delta-style 3D printer

Delta robots are widely used in industrial automation due to their high speed, precision, and stiffness-to-weight ratio. The most common use case is in high-speed pick-and-place tasks, where objects must be transferred from one location to another with minimal delay. In packaging industries, delta robots can sort, pack, and manipulate small consumer goods such as confectionery, electronics, cosmetics, or pharmaceutical products, achieving throughput rates of up to 300 cycles per minute.

These robots are often integrated with computer vision systems, enabling them to detect and track moving items on conveyor belts, orient them correctly, and pick them at high speeds even in unstructured environments. Machine vision combined with delta robots is now a standard configuration in food packaging, postal sorting, and small parts assembly.

In the electronics industry, delta robots are used for high-speed placement of components onto PCBs (Printed Circuit Boards), wire bonding, and other micro-assembly operations. Their low moving mass makes them particularly suitable for cleanroom environments, where vibrations or air disturbance must be minimized.

In medical applications, delta mechanisms have been adapted for neurosurgical positioning systems such as the Surgiscope. The system uses a delta architecture to hold and reposition surgical microscopes with sub-millimeter accuracy, offering both stability and ease of manual override by surgeons.

Delta robots have also been employed in haptic devices and virtual reality input systems due to their low inertia and high back-drivability. Small-scale delta mechanisms provide users with real-time force feedback in 3D input devices, enabling high-fidelity simulations in training and remote manipulation scenarios.

In additive manufacturing, delta robot kinematics have been adopted in delta-style 3D printers, offering a faster movement adapted to new processes. The parallel linkage allows for faster head movements and reduced inertia compared to Cartesian printers.

Microscale delta robots, such as the milliDelta, have been explored for biomedical and precision tasks. These miniature platforms use piezoelectric or flexural actuators to deliver sub-millimeter positioning with millisecond-scale response times.
