= XR-2 =

Educational robot

The XR-2 is an educational robot made by Rhino Robotics.

The robot is a multi-jointed arm, having five degrees of freedom. (It has six degrees of freedom when attached to the optional sliding base.) The arm is constructed of aluminum and the workings of the robot, such as geared electric motors and their rotary encoders, are visible. A controller, based on the 6502 CPU also found in the robot's contemporary, the Apple II, can control up to eight motors - the robot and two other items, such as a turntable or the aforementioned sliding base. There is a teach pendant, rather like those of full-size industrial robots, that can be connected to the controller. Using this, the robot can be "taught" simple programs using the pendant and can then repeat them.

== Controller interface ==
The interface for the motor controller is based on a RS-232 serial port. (9600 baud, 7 data bits, 2 stop bits, even parity.) The controller, while in one physical box, is actually two machines. The one on the top is the teach pendant computer, the one below is the motor controller proper. One can connect a computer to this serial port and send the robot commands. The commands are very simple, and many are based on text, so the controller can be commanded with a simple serial terminal or a terminal emulator program running on a PC.

The command 'F+100', for instance, will cause the F motor to move 100 units. 'F-100' would reverse the movement. Generally, the commands refer to one of the eight motors that controller can move, labeled A, B, C ... H. The number must not be larger than 127 or smaller than 128, or the signed byte holding it will overflow.

Another command is 'F?', (Where F could be any motor label). This command inquires how many steps of the current movement instruction have not yet been performed. A byte is returned, but 32 must be subtracted from this byte to get the true number of steps remaining - 32 is added so that the returned character is always a printing character and not a control character.
