= Terabot-S =

The Terabot-S is a platform-agnostic robot manipulator designed by Oceaneering Space Systems in Clear Lake, Texas USA for mobile robotics applications such as first response, military EOD, surveillance, mining, research, and CBRN sampling. Since the Terabot-S is platform agnostic, it can be fitted to virtually any unmanned ground vehicle (UGV) or mobile robotic platform. The manipulator joints have integrated clutches for protection against overloads and are fully sealed against water and dust. The manipulator has a manual, tool-free, quick-release end-effector attachment mount to allow the user to rapidly change end-effectors as needed in the field.

== See also ==
- UGV
- EOD
- Robot arm
- Manipulator (device)
- Gripper
- MATILDA a military unmanned ground vehicle
