= SurgiScope =

The SurgiScope is a microscope and robot designed to hold tools and assist in positioning those tools during neurosurgery. The unit is mounted on the ceiling, as the structure of a Delta robot and can hold instruments such as endoscopy tools, biopsy needles, and electrodes. The associated software allows for target and trajectory determination. The SurgiScope has been used for stereotactic guidance and neuronavigation during surgical procedures.
