= Manipulator (device) =

Device used to manipulate materials without direct contact by the operator

An autosampler for solid samples for radiation measurement

In robotics, a manipulator is a device used to manipulate materials without direct physical contact by the operator. The applications were originally for dealing with radioactive or biohazardous materials, using robotic arms, or they were used in inaccessible places. In more recent developments they have been used in diverse range of applications including welding automation, robotic surgery and in space. It is an arm-like mechanism that consists of a series of segments, usually sliding or jointed called cross-slides, which grasp and move objects with a number of degrees of freedom.

A robotic manipulator device for Bharatiya Antariksh Station (BAS), at 9th Bengaluru Space Expo 2026, BIEC

In industrial ergonomics a manipulator is a lift-assist device used to help workers lift, maneuver and place articles in process that are too heavy, too hot, too large or otherwise too difficult for a single worker to manually handle. As opposed to simply vertical lift assists (cranes, hoists, etc.) manipulators have the ability to reach in to tight spaces and remove workpieces. A good example would be removing large stamped parts from a press and placing them in a rack or similar dunnage. In welding, a column boom manipulator is used to increase deposition rates, reduce human error and other costs in a manufacturing setting.

Additionally, manipulator tooling gives the lift assist the ability to pitch, roll, or spin the part for appropriate placement. An example would be removing a part from a press in the horizontal and then pitching it up for vertical placement in a rack or rolling a part over for exposing the back of the part.

== Specialized types ==
One of the types of manipulators is balanced manipulator type MSP-250, controlled by the operator's hand. Such manipulators are used in various industries. Where there are special requirements to protect against fire and explosion, they may be driven by compressed air.

A welding manipulator can be either open arc or submerged arc. A welding manipulator can be used to weld horizontally and vertically and is ideal for job shops as they are robust, have high production volume capacity and a greater degree of flexibility in product engineering. Welding manipulators are commonly used in pipe and vessel fabrication but can be used in a cladding procedure with the aid of a proper welding fixture.

== Examples ==
Examples of robotic manipulators are:

- Canadarm
- Terabot-S by Oceaneering Space Systems
- SCARA
- da Vinci Surgical System

== See also ==
- Balbus-UK Limited Industrial manipulators
- ANAT Technology (Articulated Nimble Adaptable Trunk)
- Industrial robots
- Robotic arm
- Articulated robots
- Telemanipulator
- Categories
  - Parallel manipulator – articulated robot or manipulator based on a number of kinematic chains, actuators and joints, in parallel. cf. serial manipulator.
  - Remote manipulator – manipulator under direct human control, often used for work with hazardous materials.
  - Serial manipulator – articulated robot or manipulator with a single series kinematic chain of actuators. cf. parallel manipulator.
