= Man-Machine =

Man-Machine or Man and Machine may refer to:

== Technology ==
- Human–computer interaction, man-machine interaction (MMI)
- MML (programming language), a man-machine language
- Cyborg, a cybernetic organism which enhances its abilities by using technology
- Transhumanism, the idea of human enhancement via technology

== Music ==
- The Man-Machine, a 1978 album by Kraftwerk
- Man vs. Machine, a 2002 album by rapper Xzibit
- Man and Machine (album), a 2002 album by U.D.O.
- Man Machine, an early '90s techno/electro project, signed to Rhythm King

== Other ==
- Machine Man, a 1977 character created by Jack Kirby for Marvel Comics
- Mann & Machine, a 1992 American science fiction police drama television series
- Ghost in the Shell 2: Man-Machine Interface, a 1997 manga by Masamune Shirow
- Man a Machine, a 1748 work of materialist philosophy by French physician and philosopher Julien Offray de La Mettrie
- Maschinenmensch ("machine-human"), a robot featured in the film Metropolis

== See also ==
- Man engine, a ladder-like mechanism installed in mines
