= Omron Adept =

US-based robotics company

Omron Adept Technology, Inc.
- Type: Subsidiary
- Industry: Robotics, industrial automation
- Founded: 1983
- Number of locations: Pleasanton, California, United States
- Key people: Rob Cain (CEO), John D. Dulchinos
- Revenue: ▲US$ 14.3 million (4Q 2014)
- Operating income: ▼US$ -520,000 (4Q 2014)
- Net income: ▼US$ -410,000 (4Q 2014)
- Total assets: ▲US$ 29.609 million (4Q 2014)
- Total equity: ▲US$ 20.167 million (4Q 2014)
- Number of employees: 158
- Parent: Omron
- Website: www.adept.com

Omron Adept Technology, Inc. is a multinational corporation with headquarters in Pleasanton, California. The company focuses on industrial automation and robotics, including software and vision guidance. Adept has offices throughout the United States as well as in Dortmund, Germany, Paris, France, and Singapore. Adept was acquired by Omron in October 2015.

== Company history ==
Founded in 1983, Adept was originally the West Coast Division of Unimation, which later became part of Westinghouse after being a division of Consolidated Diesel Electronic (Condec). However, its roots trace back nearly ten years earlier when founders Bruce Shimano and Brian Carlisle, both Stanford graduate students, collaborated with Victor Scheinman at Stanford's AI lab.

In 2000, Adept Technology acquired Pensar Tucson Inc.

In 2015, Omron acquired Adept Technology.

Today, the company is active in a variety of industries requiring high speed, precision part handling including food handling, consumer product and electronics, packaging, medical and lab automation, automotive, as well as emerging markets like solar manufacturing.

== Robots ==
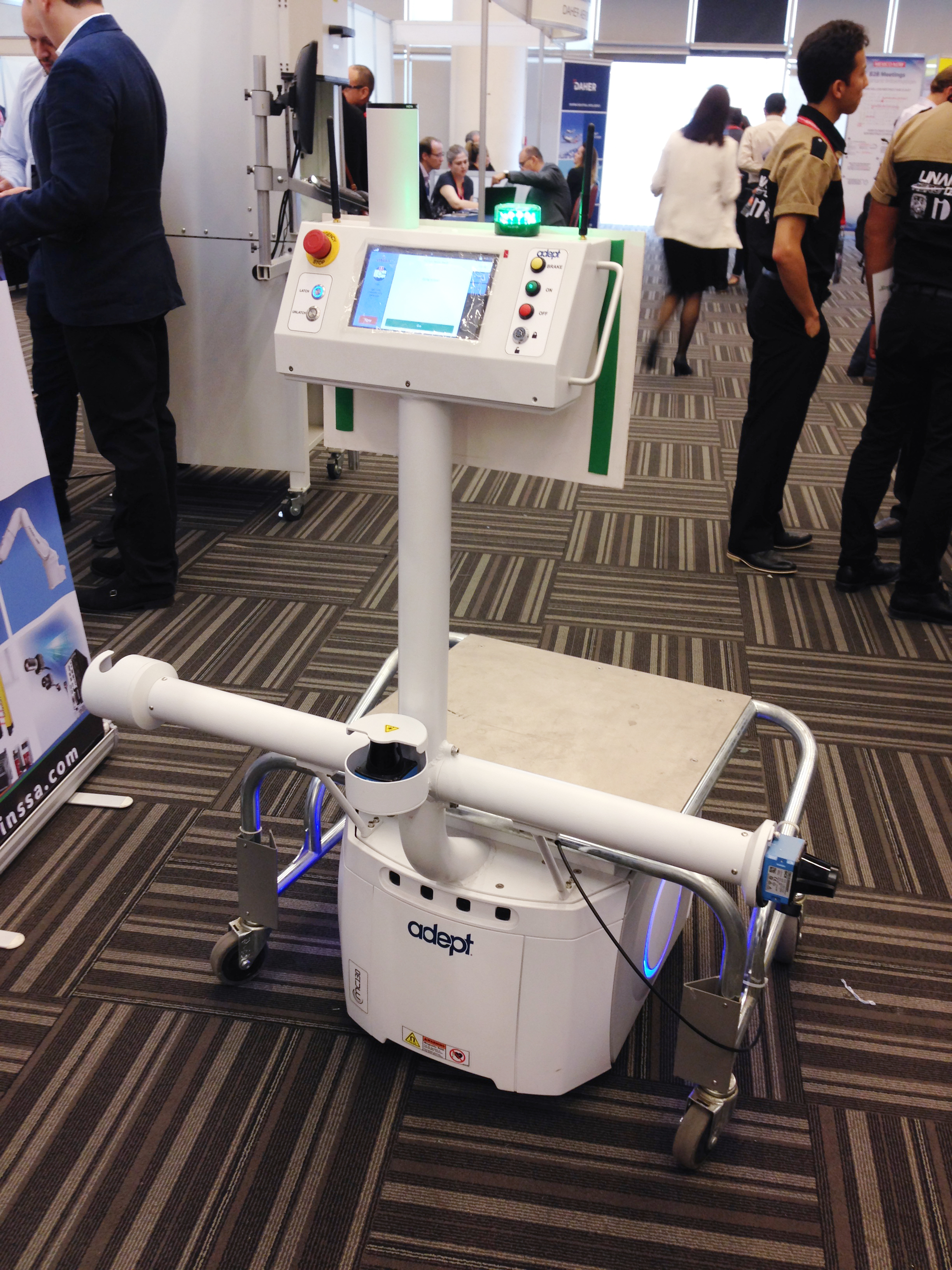
Autonomous Mobile Robot produced by Adept Technology

In 1984, the company introduced its first product, the AdeptOne SCARA robot.

Around 2004, Adept introduced table-top SCARA robots called the Adept Cobra i600/i800, with the system and servo controls, and the power amplifiers, embedded in the base of the robot. The related Adept Cobra s600/s800 models employ an external controller (with the servo controls and amplifiers still in the robot base) to achieve greater system functionality. These robots are claimed to be the fastest robots in their class.

In 2006, Adept released its new delta-4 robot, the Adept Quattro. It is based on a new concept (invented by French and Spanish researchers and described in the European patent EP 1 870 214 B1 ) of delta-style robot mechanism that has four arms versus the traditional three-arm design. The rotation is achieved through a parallel platform.

In 2010, Adept purchased MobileRobots Inc, maker of autonomous platforms and guidance software for research and industrial applications. After purchase by Omron, these intelligent vehicles became the Omron Adept LD series.

Adept also offers Adept Python linear-module robots with one to four axes in various configurations, and six-axis Adept Viper articulated robots.

In 2014, Adept partnered with ROEQ and released the Adept Lynx LD autonomous mobile robot, calling it the "cart transporter".

== Vision software ==
Scott Roth of the West Coast Division of Unimation implemented an interface to the Machine Intelligence Corporation (MIC) vision system VS-100 in early 1981. It was a binary system using blob (connectivity) analysis. Unimation's first vision system was called Univision I for PUMA robots.

When the West Coast Division of Unimation split off to become Adept Technology, Scott continued to develop the robot vision system under an agreement whereby Adept agreed to grant back software enhancements to Unimation over a period of 2 years. This agreement also applied to VAL, the robot programming language then used for the PUMA robots. Adept called the vision system AdeptVision. Scott was joined by Fred Andresen in 1984, who wrote some vision tools and AIM VisionWare, the GUI.

AdeptVision is probably the first commercially available robot vision system that achieved sales in the thousands of units. AdeptVision included many vision-related operations for image capture, enhancement, and analysis. It provided machine guidance with robot-vision calibration and supported online gauging and assembly verification. Provided functionality included rulers (line and arc), windows (rectangular, round, annulus, and pie-shaped regions of interest), feature finders (line and arc fitters), normalized grayscale correlation, blob analysis, processing tools (gradient or Sobel edge detection, thresholding, morphology, image subtraction, histogram, frame copy, pan & zoom, and convolutions), and feature-based recognition. The rotation and scale invariant ObjectFinder was patented.

The “ruler” created by Fred Andresen is an important metrology tool that locates edges along a line or arc with sub-pixel accuracy. The linear version operates in any orientation and is the basis of the line and arc fitters, providing high accuracy in grayscale images.

AdeptVision systems ranged from binary linescan for conveyor belts to binary and grayscale 2-D images. The system controllers evolved from the Q-bus to the Multibus to the VME bus. The first system consisted of the DEC LSI-11/23 CPU, EG&G Reticon line camera, camera interface board that included a run-length processor, a Peritek display processor board (512 x 512 x 1 bitmap), and a B&W display/terminal.

The various versions of the vision systems over time included AdeptVision I [256 x 241 x 1-bit binary], AdeptVision II [375 x 483 x 1-bit binary], AdeptVision ML [256 x 1-bit for moving line], -XGS [509 x 481 x 7-bit grayscale], -XGS II [509 x 481 x 7-bit grayscale], -AGS [512 x 484 x 8-bit grayscale], -AGS II, -AGS-GV [512 x 484 x 8-bit grayscale], -VME [640 x 480 or 1024 x 1024 x 7-bit grayscale], and -VXL. The AdeptVision XGS and AGS systems were particularly popular in Adept's early history, with 1000 AdeptVision AGS systems alone having been shipped as of January 25, 1993.

== Hardware and software history ==
Adept has its own robot control operating system, V+, which has come to version 17.x by 2009. The history of V+ dates back to the days of Unimation. At the time it was called VAL (Victor's Assembly Language), which evolved into VAL-II and VAL-III later. After the formation of Adept, the rights to parts of the OS were granted to Adept by Unimation as described above..

The Adept OS at that time was called V, and it ran on the refrigerator-sized controllers that were based on the MultiBus technology. Around 1986 the Adept MC controller was introduced; while still based on the MultiBus, it was smaller than the original controller. After the Adept MC controller (around 1990), came the Adept MV controller, which was based on the VME backplane technology. Then around 2000 the SmartController CS/CX controllers were introduced, which are current production as of 2009.

Along with the changes of the controller itself, the servo controls also saw major improvements over the years. Around 200x, with the V+ version reaching ver.14, the servo amplifier and controls were part of the robot, and hence separated from the main robot controller itself. This is when distributed controls were introduced by the company. The idea of having the amplifier and servo controls in the base of the robot was named AIB (Amplifier in Base). Adept still follows the AIB mantra, and has an AIB in the latest robot, Adept Quattro, reducing the footprint of the robot/manipulator/controller system.

== Controls ==
The Adept core business continues to be motion control. Its SmartController CX integrates motion controller, vision guidance, and interfaces to factory networks.

== See also ==
- ABB
- Fanuc
- Denso
- Epson Robots
- KUKA
