= Remote manipulator =

Device for controlling a hand-like mechanism

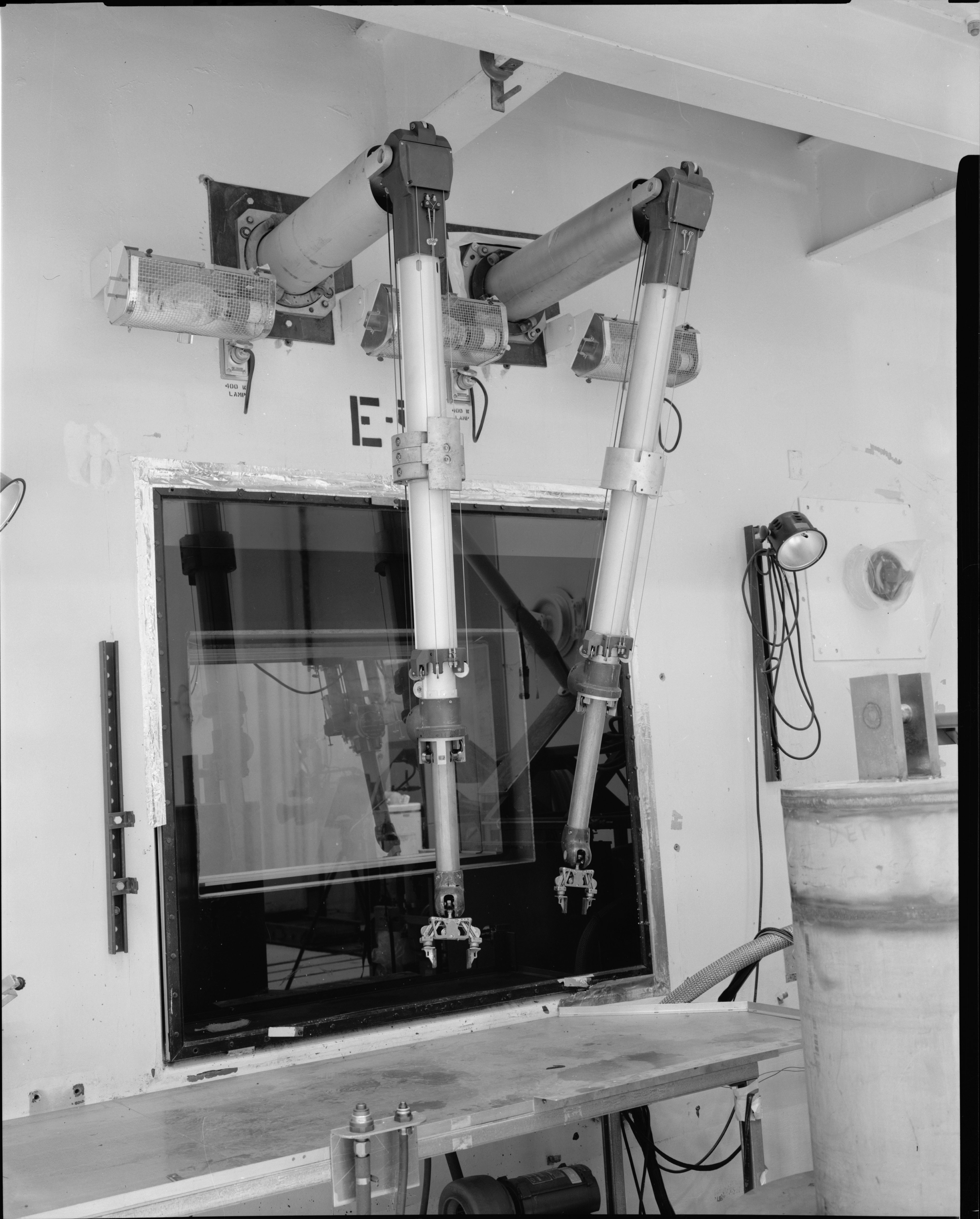
Manipulator arms inside the Hot Bay of the Engine Maintenance Assembly and Disassembly Facility at Area 25 of the Nevada Test Site

A remote manipulator, also known as a telefactor, telemanipulator, or waldo (after the 1942 short story "Waldo" by Robert A. Heinlein), is a device which, through electronic, hydraulic, or mechanical linkages, allows a hand-like mechanism to be controlled by a human operator. The purpose of such a device is usually to move or manipulate hazardous materials for reasons of safety, similar to the operation and play of a claw crane game.

== History ==
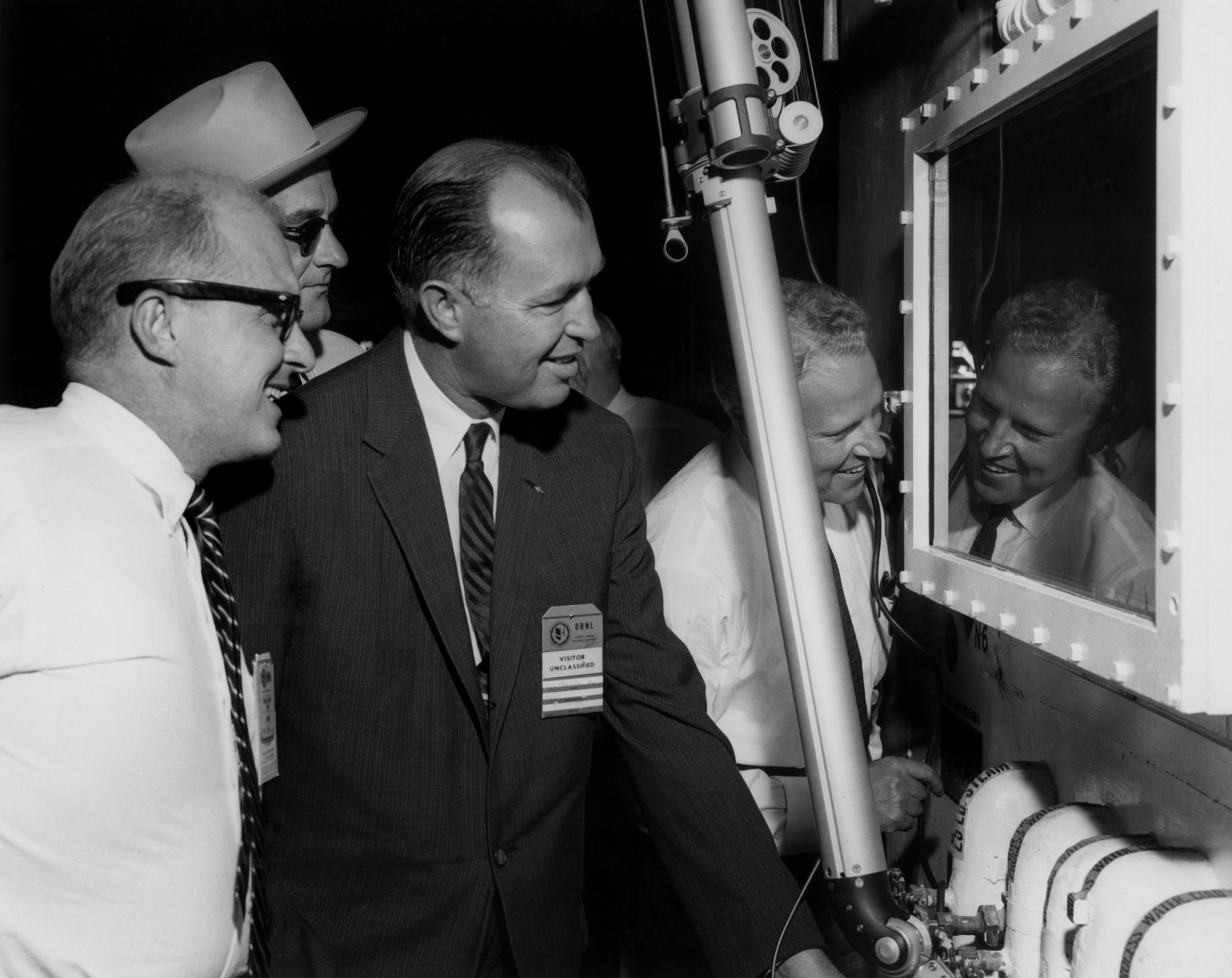
Cayce Pentecost, Lyndon B. Johnson, Buford Ellington and Albert Gore Sr operating mechanical hands at a hot cell at Oak Ridge National Laboratory, on October 19, 1958

In 1945, the company Central Research Laboratories was given the contract to develop a remote manipulator for the Argonne National Laboratory. The intent was to replace devices which manipulated highly radioactive materials from above a sealed chamber or hot cell, with a mechanism which operated through the side wall of the chamber, allowing a researcher to stand normally while working.

The result was the Master-Slave Manipulator Mk. 8, or MSM-8, which became the iconic remote manipulator seen in newsreels and movies, such as The Andromeda Strain or THX 1138.

Robert A. Heinlein claimed a much earlier origin for remote manipulators. He wrote that he got the idea for the "waldos" used in his story after reading a 1918 article in Popular Mechanics about "a poor fellow afflicted with myasthenia gravis ... [who] devised complicated lever arrangements to enable him to use what little strength he had." A 2021 article in Science Robotics on robots, science fiction, and nuclear accidents discusses how the science fiction waldos are now a major type of real-world robots used in the nuclear industry.

== See also ==
- Glovebox
- Dextre
- Doctor Octopus
- Teleoperation
- Telerobotics
- Master/slave (technology)
- Avatar (computing)
- Pantograph
- Man-Machine
