= Serial manipulator =

Industrial robot

Serial manipulators are the most common industrial robots and they are designed as a series of links connected by motor-actuated joints that extend from a base to an end-effector. Often they have an anthropomorphic arm structure described as having a "shoulder", an "elbow", and a "wrist".

Serial robots usually have six joints, because it requires at least six degrees of freedom to place a manipulated object in an arbitrary position and orientation in the workspace of the robot.

A popular application for serial robots in today's industry is the pick-and-place assembly robot, called a SCARA robot, which has four degrees of freedom.

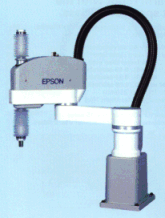
A SCARA assembly robot.

== Structure ==
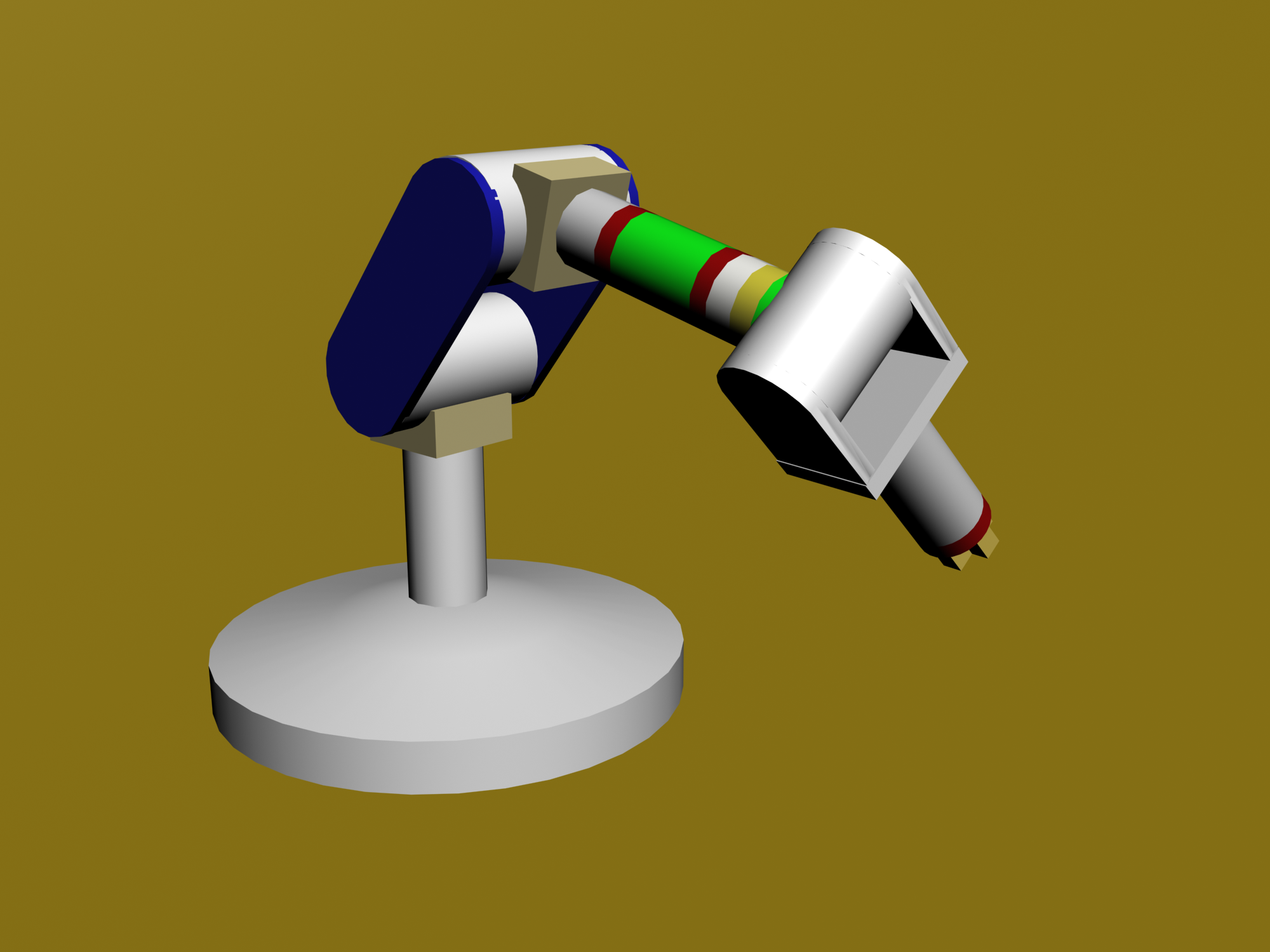
An example of a serial manipulator with six DOF in a kinematic chain.

In its most general form, a serial robot consists of a number of rigid links connected to joints. Simplicity considerations in manufacturing and control have led to robots with only revolute or prismatic joints and orthogonal, parallel and/or intersecting joint axes (instead of arbitrarily placed joint axes).
Donald L. Pieper derived the first practically relevant result in this context, referred to as 321 kinematic structure: The inverse kinematics of serial manipulators with six revolute joints, and with three consecutive joints intersecting, can be solved in closed-form, i.e. analytically This result had a tremendous influence on the design of industrial robots.

The main advantage of a serial manipulator is a large workspace with respect to the size of the robot and the floor space it occupies. The main disadvantages of these robots are:

- the low stiffness inherent to an open kinematic structure,
- errors are accumulated and amplified from link to link,
- the fact that they have to carry and move the large weight of most of the actuators, and
- the relatively low effective load that they can manipulate.

== Kinematics ==
The position and orientation of a robot's end effector are derived from the joint positions by means of a geometric model of the robot arm. For serial robots, the mapping from joint positions to end-effector pose is easy, the inverse mapping is more difficult. Therefore, most industrial robots have special designs that reduce the complexity of the inverse mapping.

=== Workspace ===
The reachable workspace of a robot's end-effector is the manifold of reachable frames.
The dextrous workspace consists of the points of the reachable workspace where the robot can generate velocities that span the complete tangent space at that point, i.e., it can translate the manipulated object with three degrees of freedom, and rotate the object with three degrees of rotation freedom.
The relationships between joint space and Cartesian space coordinates of the object held by the robot are in general multiple-valued: the same pose can be reached by the serial arm in different ways, each with a different set of joint coordinates. Hence the reachable workspace of the robot is divided in configurations (also called assembly modes), in which the kinematic relationships are locally one-to-one.

=== Singularity ===
A singularity is a configuration of a serial manipulator in which the joint parameters no longer completely define the position and orientation of the end-effector. Singularities occur in configurations when joint axes align in a way that reduces the ability of the arm to position the end-effector. For example when a serial manipulator is fully extended it is in what is known as the boundary singularity.

At a singularity the end-effector loses one or more degrees of twist freedom (instantaneously, the end-effector cannot move in these directions).
Serial robots with less than six independent joints are always singular in the sense that they can never span a six-dimensional twist space. This is often called an architectural singularity. A singularity is usually not an isolated point in the workspace of the robot, but a sub-manifold.

=== Redundant manipulator ===
A redundant manipulator has more than six degrees of freedom which means that it has additional joint parameters that allow the configuration of the robot to change while it holds its end-effector in a fixed position and orientation.

A typical redundant manipulator has seven joints, for example three at the shoulder, one elbow joint and three at the wrist. This manipulator can move its elbow around a circle while it maintains a specific position and orientation of its end-effector.

A snake robot has many more than six degrees of freedom and is often called hyper-redundant.

== Manufacturers ==
- ABB Robotics
- Adept Technology
- Comau
- Epson Robots
- FANUC Robotics
- Kawasaki Robotics
- KUKA
- Mitsubishi
- Motoman
- Staubli
- Robotics Design
- Universal Robots

== See also ==
- Parallel manipulator
- Robot kinematics
