= Degrees of freedom (mechanics) =

Number of independent parameters needed to define the state of a mechanical system

In physics, the number of degrees of freedom (DOF) of a mechanical system is the number of independent parameters required to completely specify its configuration or state. That number is an important property in the analysis of systems of bodies in mechanical engineering, structural engineering, aerospace engineering, robotics, and other fields.

As an example, the position of a train has one degree of freedom because it can be completely specified by a single value expressing the locomotive's distance along the track. Meanwhile, a basic automobile has three DOF as its position can be defined by forward-reverse drive, side-to-side inertia, and rotation. A rigid body has at most six DOF, three of translation and three of rotation.

The traditional humanoid arm can be expressed as a kinematic chain with seven DOF, consisting of the three rotation axes of both the shoulder and wrist, as well as the single axis of the elbow.

== Overview ==
As an example, the position of a train has one degree of freedom because it can be completely specified by a single value expressing the locomotive's distance along the track—which in turn controls the distance of its dependents, the attached cars.

For a second example, an automobile with a very stiff suspension can be considered to be a rigid body traveling on a plane (a flat, two-dimensional space). This body has three independent DOF consisting of two components of translation (i.e. drive and inertia) which together specify its position and one angle of rotation specifying its orientation. Drifting is an example of all three independent DOF of an automobile being used.

The number of DOF is an important property in the analysis of systems of bodies in mechanical engineering, structural engineering, aerospace engineering, robotics, and other fields.

== Motions and dimensions ==
The position of an n-dimensional rigid body is defined by the rigid transformation, [T] = [A, d], where d is an n-dimensional translation and A is an n × n rotation matrix, which has n translational degrees of freedom and n(n − 1)/2 rotational degrees of freedom. The number of rotational degrees of freedom comes from the dimension of the rotation group SO(n).

A non-rigid or deformable body may be thought of as a collection of many minute particles (infinite number of DOFs), this is often approximated by a finite DOF system. When motion involving large displacements is the main objective of study (e.g. for analyzing the motion of satellites), a deformable body may be approximated as a rigid body (or even a particle) in order to simplify the analysis.

The degree of freedom of a system can be viewed as the minimum number of coordinates required to specify a configuration. Applying this definition, we have:

1. For a single particle in a plane two coordinates define its location so it has two degrees of freedom;
2. A single particle in space requires three coordinates so it has three degrees of freedom;
3. Two particles in space have a combined six degrees of freedom;
4. If two particles in space are constrained to maintain a constant distance from each other, such as in the case of a diatomic molecule, then the six coordinates must satisfy a single constraint equation defined by the distance formula. This reduces the degree of freedom of the system to five, because the distance formula can be used to solve for the remaining coordinate once the other five are specified.

== Rigid bodies ==
The six degrees of freedom of movement of a ship

Attitude degrees of freedom for an airplane

Mnemonics to remember angle names

A single rigid body has at most six degrees of freedom (6 DOF) 3T3R consisting of three translations 3T and three rotations 3R.

For example, the motion of a ship at sea has the six degrees of freedom of a rigid body, and is described as:

Translation and rotation:
1. Walking (or surging): Moving forward and backward;
2. Strafing (or swaying): Moving left and right;
3. Elevating (or heaving): Moving up and down;
4. Roll rotation: Pivots side to side;
5. Pitch rotation: Tilts forward and backward;
6. Yaw rotation: Swivels left and right;

For example, the trajectory of an airplane in flight has three degrees of freedom and its attitude along the trajectory has three degrees of freedom, for a total of six degrees of freedom.

- For rolling in flight and ship dynamics, see roll (aviation) and roll (ship motion), respectively.
  - An important derivative is the roll rate (or roll velocity), which is the angular speed at which an aircraft can change its roll attitude, and is typically expressed in degrees per second.
- For pitching in flight and ship dynamics, see pitch (aviation) and pitch (ship motion), respectively.
- For yawing in flight and ship dynamics, see yaw (aviation) and yaw (ship motion), respectively.
  - One important derivative is the yaw rate (or yaw velocity), the angular speed of yaw rotation, measured with a yaw rate sensor.
  - Another important derivative is the yawing moment, the angular momentum of a yaw rotation, which is important for adverse yaw in aircraft dynamics.

=== Lower mobility ===
Physical constraints may limit the number of degrees of freedom of a single rigid body. For example, a block sliding around on a flat table has 3 DOF 2T1R consisting of two translations 2T and 1 rotation 1R. An XYZ positioning robot like SCARA has 3 DOF 3T lower mobility.

== Mobility formula ==
The mobility formula counts the number of parameters that define the configuration of a set of rigid bodies that are constrained by joints connecting these bodies.

Consider a system of n rigid bodies moving in space has 6n degrees of freedom measured relative to a fixed frame. In order to count the degrees of freedom of this system, include the fixed body in the count of bodies, so that mobility is independent of the choice of the body that forms the fixed frame. Then the degree-of-freedom of the unconstrained system of N = n + 1 is

$$M=6n=6(N-1), \!$$

because the fixed body has zero degrees of freedom relative to itself.

Joints that connect bodies in this system remove degrees of freedom and reduce mobility. Specifically, hinges and sliders each impose five constraints and therefore remove five degrees of freedom. It is convenient to define the number of constraints c that a joint imposes in terms of the joint's freedom f, where c = 6 − f. In the case of a hinge or slider, which are one degree of freedom joints, have f = 1 and therefore c = 6 − 1 = 5.

The result is that the mobility of a system formed from n moving links and j joints each with freedom f_{i}, i = 1, ..., j, is given by

$$M = 6n - \sum_{i=1}^j\ (6 - f_i) =  6(N-1 - j) + \sum_{i=1}^j\ f_i$$

Recall that N includes the fixed link.

There are two important special cases: (i) a simple open chain, and (ii) a simple closed chain. A single open chain consists of n moving links connected end to end by n joints, with one end connected to a ground link. Thus, in this case N = j + 1 and the mobility of the chain is

$$M = \sum_{i=1}^j\ f_i$$

For a simple closed chain, n moving links are connected end-to-end by n + 1 joints such that the two ends are connected to the ground link forming a loop. In this case, we have N = j and the mobility of the chain is

$$M = \sum_{i=1}^j\ f_i - 6$$

An example of a simple open chain is a serial robot manipulator. These robotic systems are constructed from a series of links connected by six one degree-of-freedom revolute or prismatic joints, so the system has six degrees of freedom.

An example of a simple closed chain is the RSSR spatial four-bar linkage. The sum of the freedom of these joints is eight, so the mobility of the linkage is two, where one of the degrees of freedom is the rotation of the coupler around the line joining the two S joints.

=== Planar and spherical movement ===
It is common practice to design the linkage system so that the movement of all of the bodies are constrained to lie on parallel planes, to form what is known as a planar linkage. It is also possible to construct the linkage system so that all of the bodies move on concentric spheres, forming a spherical linkage. In both cases, the degrees of freedom of the links in each system is now three rather than six, and the constraints imposed by joints are now c = 3 − f.

In this case, the mobility formula is given by

$$M = 3(N- 1 - j)+ \sum_{i=1}^j\ f_i,$$

and the special cases become

- planar or spherical simple open chain,
  $$M = \sum_{i=1}^j\ f_i,$$
- planar or spherical simple closed chain,
  $$M = \sum_{i=1}^j\ f_i - 3.$$

An example of a planar simple closed chain is the planar four-bar linkage, which is a four-bar loop with four one degree-of-freedom joints and therefore has mobility M = 1.

=== Systems of bodies ===
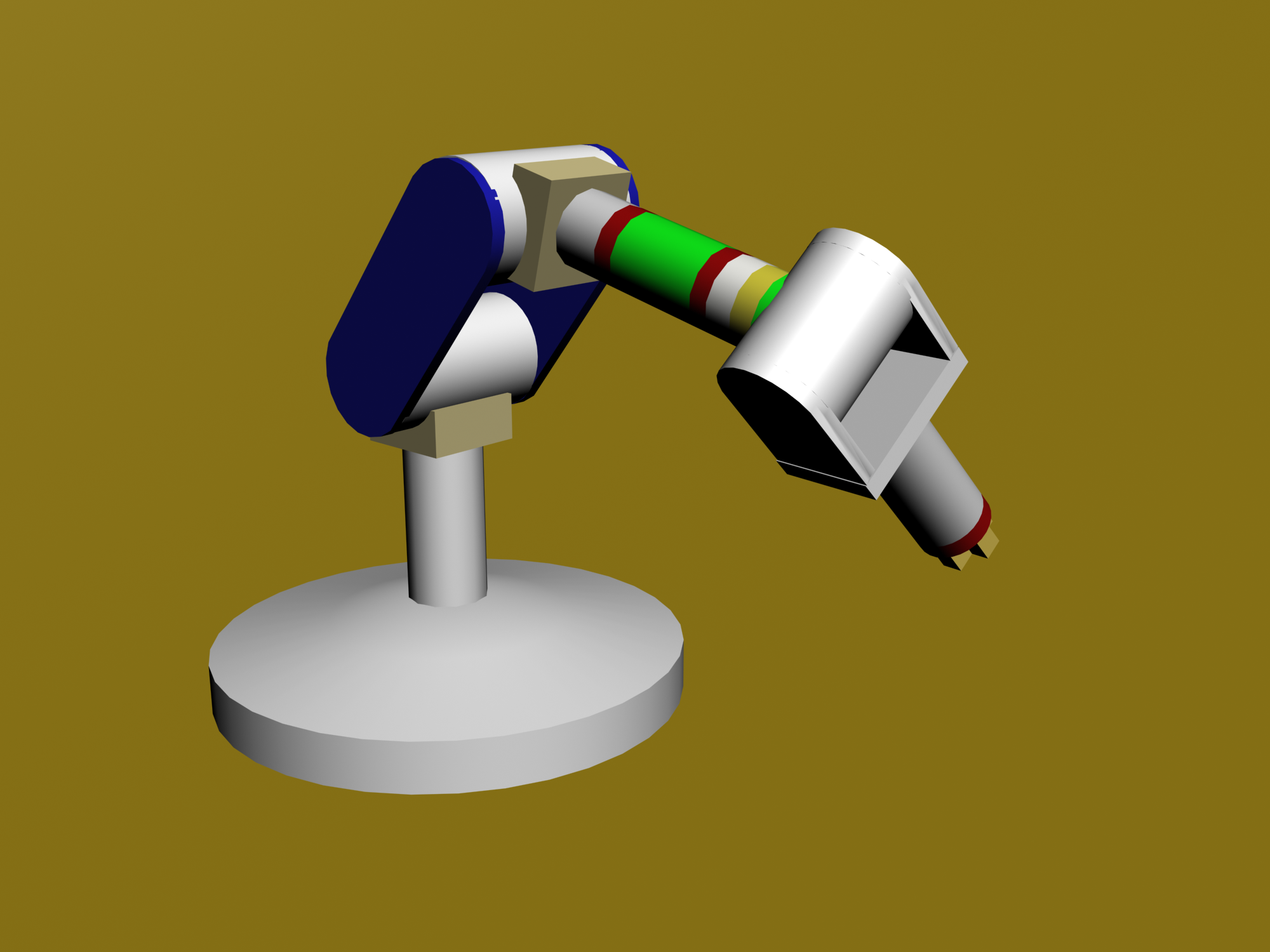
An articulated robot with six DOF in a kinematic chain

A system with several bodies would have a combined DOF that is the sum of the DOFs of the bodies, less the internal constraints they may have on relative motion. A mechanism or linkage containing a number of connected rigid bodies may have more than the degrees of freedom for a single rigid body. Here the term degrees of freedom is used to describe the number of parameters needed to specify the spatial pose of a linkage. It is also defined in context of the configuration space, task space and workspace of a robot.

A specific type of linkage is the open kinematic chain, where a set of rigid links are connected at joints; a joint may provide one DOF (hinge/sliding), or two (cylindrical). Such chains occur commonly in robotics, biomechanics, and for satellites and other space structures. A human arm is considered to have seven DOFs, composing the conventional shoulder-elbow-wrist (SEW) angle. Both the shoulder and wrist have three rotation axes (mimicking yaw, pitch, and roll), while an elbow has one axis. DOFs that achieve the same end-effector position are said to be redundant. The SEW angle contains the redundancy of shoulder and wrist rotation, but this can be beneficial to help the elbow avoid obstacles. A system with mechanisms to control all of its DOFs is said to be holonomic, while a system that lacks some controls is said to be non-holonomic.

In mobile robotics, a car-like robot can reach any position and orientation in 2D space, so it needs 3 degrees of freedom to describe its pose, but at any point, you can move it only by a forward motion and a steering angle. So it has two control degrees of freedom and three representational degrees of freedom; i.e. it is non-holonomic. A fixed-wing aircraft, with 3 to 4 control degrees of freedom (forward motion, roll, pitch, and to a limited extent, yaw) in a 3D space, is also non-holonomic, as it cannot move directly up/down or left/right.

A summary of formulas and methods for computing the degrees-of-freedom in mechanical systems has been given by Pennestri, Cavacece, and Vita. To ensure that a mechanical device's degrees of freedom neither underconstrain nor overconstrain it, its design can be managed using the exact constraint method.

== Electrical engineering ==
In electrical engineering, degrees of freedom is often used to describe the number of directions in which a phased array antenna can form either beams or nulls. It is equal to one less than the number of elements contained in the array, as one element is used as a reference against which either constructive or destructive interference may be applied using each of the remaining antenna elements. Radar practice and communication link practice, with beam steering being more prevalent for radar applications and null steering being more prevalent for interference suppression in communication links.

== See also ==
- Gimbal lock – Loss of one degree of freedom in a three-dimensional, three-gimbal mechanism
- Kinematics – Branch of physics describing the motion of objects without considering forces
- Kinematic pair – Connection between two physical objects which constrains their relative movement
- XR-2 – Educational robot
