= Mobile robot =

Robot capable of locomotion

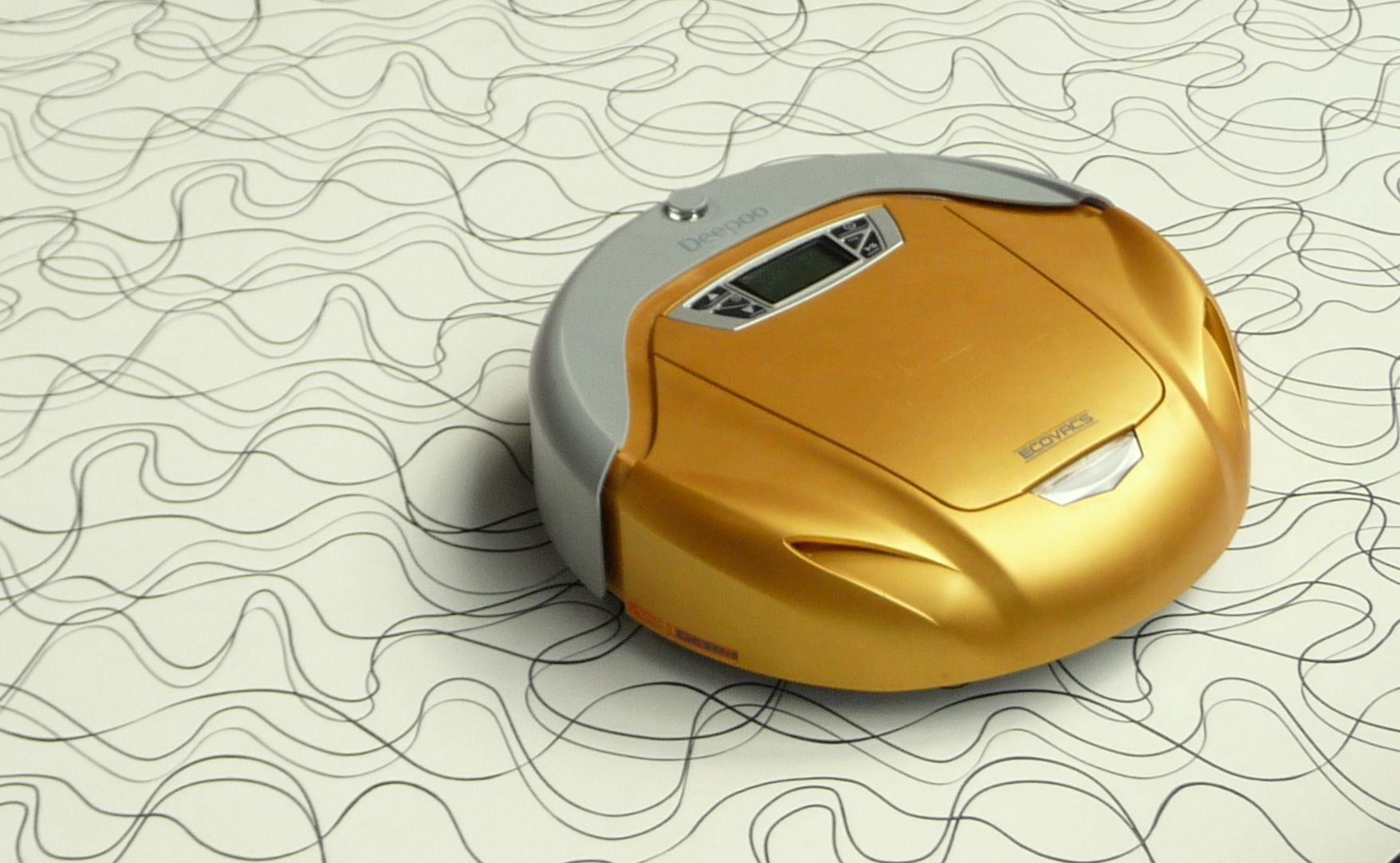
A robotic vacuum cleaner

A mobile robot is an automatic machine that is capable of locomotion. Mobile robotics is usually considered to be a subfield of robotics and information engineering.

Mobile robots have the capability to move around in their environment and are not fixed to one physical location. Mobile robots can be "autonomous" (AMR - autonomous mobile robot) which means they are capable of navigating an uncontrolled environment without the need for physical or electro-mechanical guidance devices. Alternatively, mobile robots can rely on guidance devices that allow them to travel a pre-defined navigation route in relatively controlled space. By contrast, industrial robots are usually more-or-less stationary, consisting of a jointed arm (multi-linked manipulator) and gripper assembly (or end effector), attached to a fixed surface.

Mobile robots have become more commonplace in commercial and industrial settings. Hospitals have been using autonomous mobile robots to move materials for many years. Warehouses have installed mobile robotic systems to efficiently move materials from stocking shelves to order fulfillment zones. Mobile robots are also a major focus of current research and almost every major university has one or more labs that focus on mobile robot research. Mobile robots are also found in industrial, military and security settings.

The components of a mobile robot are a controller, sensors, actuators and power system. The controller is generally a microprocessor, embedded microcontroller or a personal computer (PC). The sensors used are dependent upon the requirements of the robot. The requirements could be dead reckoning, tactile and proximity sensing, triangulation ranging, collision avoidance, position location and other specific applications. Actuators usually refer to the motors that move the robot can be wheeled or legged. To power a mobile robot ,people usually use DC power supply (which is a battery) instead of AC.

== Classification ==
Mobile robots may be classified by:

- The environment in which they travel:
  - Land or home robots are usually referred to as unmanned ground vehicles (UGVs). They are most commonly wheeled or tracked, but also include legged robots with two or more legs (humanoid, or resembling animals or insects).
  - Delivery and transportation robots can move materials and supplies through a work environment
  - Aerial robots are usually referred to as unmanned aerial vehicles (UAVs)
  - Underwater robots are usually called autonomous underwater vehicles (AUVs)
  - Polar robots, designed to navigate icy, crevasse filled environments
- The device they use to move, mainly:
  - Legged robot: human-like legs (i.e., an android) or animal-like legs.
  - Wheeled robot.
  - Tracks.

== Mobile robot navigation ==
There are many types of mobile robot navigation:

=== Manual remote or tele-op ===
A manually teleoperated robot is totally under control of a driver with a joystick or other control device. The device may be plugged directly into the robot, may be a wireless joystick, or may be an accessory to a wireless computer or other controller. A tele-op'd robot is typically used to keep the operator out of harm's way. Examples of manual remote robots include Robotics Design's ANATROLLER ARI-100 and ARI-50, Foster-Miller's Talon, iRobot's PackBot, and KumoTek's MK-705 Roosterbot.

=== Guarded tele-op ===
A guarded tele-op robot has the ability to sense and avoid obstacles but will otherwise navigate as driven, like a robot under manual tele-op. Few if any mobile robots offer only guarded tele-op. (See Sliding Autonomy below.)

=== Line-following car ===
Some of the earliest automated guided vehicles (AGVs) were line following mobile robots. They might follow a visual line painted or embedded in the floor or ceiling or an electrical wire in the floor. Most of these robots operated a simple "keep the line in the center sensor" algorithm. They could not circumnavigate obstacles; they just stopped and waited when something blocked their path. Many examples of such vehicles are still sold, by Transbotics, FMC, Egemin, HK Systems and many other companies. These types of robots are still widely popular in well known Robotic societies as a first step towards learning nooks and corners of robotics. However it is not practical to be implemented in the public area such as restaurants, airports and shopping malls.

=== Autonomously randomized robot ===
Autonomous robots with random motion basically bounce off walls, whether those walls are sensed.

=== Autonomously guided robot (AGR) ===
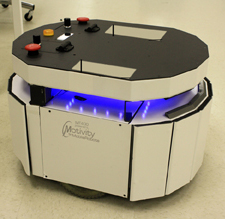
Robot developers use ready-made autonomous bases and software to design robot applications quickly. Shells shaped like people or cartoon characters may cover the base to disguise it.

An autonomously guided robot knows at least some information about where it is and how to reach various goals and or waypoints along the way. "Localization" or knowledge of its current location, is calculated by one or more means, using sensors such motor encoders, vision, Stereopsis, lasers and global positioning systems.

Positioning systems often use triangulation, relative position and/or Monte-Carlo/Markov localization to determine the location and orientation of the platform, from which it can plan a path to its next waypoint or goal. It can gather sensor readings that are time- and location-stamped. Such robots are often part of the wireless enterprise network, interfaced with other sensing and control systems in the building. For instance, the PatrolBot security robot responds to alarms, operates elevators and notifies the command center when an incident arises. Other autonomously guided robots include the SpeciMinder and the TUG delivery robots for the hospital.

Autonomously Mobile Robot (AMR)

=== Sliding autonomy ===
More capable robots combine multiple levels of navigation under a system called sliding autonomy. Most autonomously guided robots, such as the HelpMate hospital robot, also offer a manual mode which allows the robot to be controlled by a person. The Motivity autonomous robot operating system, which is used in the ADAM, PatrolBot, SpeciMinder, MapperBot and a number of other robots, offers full sliding autonomy, from manual to guarded to autonomous modes.

== History ==
Date	Developments
1939–1945	During World War II the first mobile robots emerged as a result of technical advances on a number of relatively new research fields like computer science and cybernetics. They were mostly flying bombs. Examples are smart bombs that only detonate within a certain range of the target, the use of guiding systems and radar control. The V1 and V2 rockets had a crude 'autopilot' and automatic detonation systems. They were the predecessors of modern cruise missiles.
1948–1949	W. Grey Walter builds Elmer and Elsie, two autonomous robots called Machina Speculatrix because these robots liked to explore their environment. Elmer and Elsie were each equipped with a light sensor. If they found a light source they would move towards it, avoiding or moving obstacles on their way. These robots demonstrated that complex behaviour could arise from a simple design. Elmer and Elsie only had the equivalent of two nerve cells.
1961–1963	The Johns Hopkins University develops 'Beast'. Beast used a sonar to move around. When its batteries ran low it would find a power socket and plug itself in.
1969	Mowbot was the very first robot that would automatically mow the lawn.
1970	The Stanford Cart line follower was a mobile robot that was able to follow a white line, using a camera to see. It was radio linked to a large mainframe that made the calculations. At about the same time (1966–1972) the Stanford Research Institute is building and doing research on Shakey the Robot, a robot named after its jerky motion. Shakey had a camera, a rangefinder, bump sensors and a radio link. Shakey was the first robot that could reason about its actions. This means that Shakey could be given very general commands, and that the robot would figure out the necessary steps to accomplish the given task. The Soviet Union explores the surface of the Moon with Lunokhod 1, a lunar rover.
1976	In its Viking program the NASA sends two unmanned spacecraft to Mars.
1977–1979	IEEE Spectrum introduces the Micromouse competition, accelerating the development of small, self-contained autonomous mobile robots. Unlike earlier mainframe-dependent robots requiring radio links or tethers, entries like Moonlight Special (1978) utilized onboard microprocessors to process sensor data, map unknown mazes, and execute maze-solving algorithms entirely on battery power.
1980	The interest of the public in robots rises, resulting in robots that could be purchased for home use. These robots served entertainment or educational purposes. Examples include the RB5X, which still exists today and the HERO series. The Stanford Cart is now able to navigate its way through obstacle courses and make maps of its environment.
Early 1980s	The team of Ernst Dickmanns at the University of the Bundeswehr Munich builds the first robot cars, driving up to 55 mph on empty streets.
1983	Stevo Bozinovski and Mihail Sestakov control a mobile robot by parallel programming, using multitasking system of IBM Series/1 computer.
1986	Stevo Bozinovski and Gjorgi Gruevski control a wheeled robot using speech commands. The project was supported by the Macedonian Association for Scientific Activities.
1987	Hughes Research Laboratories demonstrates the first cross-country map and sensor-based autonomous operation of a robotic vehicle.
1988	Stevo Bozinovski, Mihail Sestakov, and Liljana Bozinovska control a mobile robot using EEG signals.
1989	Stevo Bozinovski and his team control a mobile robot using EOG signals.
1989	Mark Tilden invents BEAM robotics.
1990s	Joseph Engelberger, father of the industrial robotic arm, works with colleagues to design the first commercially available autonomous mobile hospital robots, sold by Helpmate. The US Department of Defense funds the MDARS-I project, based on the Cybermotion indoor security robot.
1991	Edo. Franzi, André Guignard and Francesco Mondada developed Khepera, an autonomous small mobile robot intended for research activities. The project was supported by the LAMI-EPFL lab.
1993–1994	Dante I and Dante II were developed by Carnegie Mellon University. Both were walking robots used to explore live volcanoes.
1994	With guests on board, the twin robot vehicles VaMP and VITA-2 of Daimler-Benz and Ernst Dickmanns of UniBwM drive more than one thousand kilometers on a Paris three-lane highway in standard heavy traffic at speeds up to 130 km/h. They demonstrate autonomous driving in free lanes, convoy driving, and lane changes left and right with autonomous passing of other cars.
1995	Semi-autonomous ALVINN steered a car coast-to-coast under computer control for all but about 50 of the 2850 miles. Throttle and brakes, however, were controlled by a human driver.
1995	In the same year, one of Ernst Dickmanns' robot cars (with robot-controlled throttle and brakes) drove more than 1000 miles from Munich to Copenhagen and back, in traffic, at up to 120 mph, occasionally executing maneuvers to pass other cars (only in a few critical situations a safety driver took over). Active vision was used to deal with rapidly changing street scenes.
1995	The Pioneer programmable mobile robot becomes commercially available at an affordable price, enabling a widespread increase in robotics research and university study over the next decade as mobile robotics becomes a standard part of the university curriculum.
1996	Cyberclean Systems develops the first fully autonomous vacuum cleaning robot that self-charged, operated elevators and vacuumed hallways with no human intervention.
1996–1997	NASA sends the Mars Pathfinder with its rover Sojourner to Mars. The rover explores the surface, commanded from earth. Sojourner was equipped with a hazard avoidance system. This enabled Sojourner to autonomously find its way through unknown martian terrain.
1999	Sony introduces Aibo, a robotic dog capable of seeing, walking and interacting with its environment. The PackBot remote-controlled military mobile robot is introduced.
2001	Start of the Swarm-bots project. Swarm bots resemble insect colonies. Typically they consist of a large number of individual simple robots, that can interact with each other and together perform complex tasks.
2002	Roomba appears, a domestic autonomous mobile robot that cleans the floor.
2002	Nevena Bozinovska, Gjorgi Jovancevski, and Stevo Bozinovski carried out Internet-based robot control in a distance learning robotics class. A mobile robot in United States, South Carolina State University, was controlled by students in Europe, Sts. Cyril and Methodius University.
2003	Axxon Robotics purchases Intellibot, manufacturer of a line of commercial robots that scrub, vacuum, and sweep floors in hospitals, office buildings and other commercial buildings. Floor care robots from Intellibot Robotics LLC operate completely autonomously, mapping their environment and using an array of sensors for navigation and obstacle avoidance.
2004	Robosapien, a biomorphic toy robot designed by Mark Tilden is commercially available. In 'The Centibots Project' 100 autonomous robots work together to make a map of an unknown environment and search for objects within the environment. In the first DARPA Grand Challenge competition, fully autonomous vehicles compete against each other on a desert course.
2005	Boston Dynamics creates a quadruped robot intended to carry heavy loads across terrain too rough for vehicles.
2006	Sony stops making Aibo and HelpMate halts production, but a lower-cost PatrolBot customizable autonomous service robot system becomes available as mobile robots continue the struggle to become commercially viable. The US Department of Defense drops the MDARS-I project, but funds MDARS-E, an autonomous field robot. TALON-Sword, the first commercially available robot with grenade launcher and other integrated weapons options, is released. Honda's Asimo learns to run and climb stairs.
2007	In the DARPA Urban Grand Challenge, six vehicles autonomously complete a complex course involving manned vehicles and obstacles. Kiva Systems robots proliferate in distribution operations; these automated shelving units sort themselves according to the popularity of their contents. The Tug becomes a popular means for hospitals to move large cabinets of stock from place to place, while the Speci-Minder with Motivity begins carrying blood and other patient samples from nurses' stations to various labs. Seekur, the first widely available, non-military outdoor service robot, pulls a 3-ton vehicle across a parking lot, drives autonomously indoors and begins learning how to navigate itself outside. Meanwhile, PatrolBot learns to follow people and detect doors that are ajar.
2008	Boston Dynamics released video footage of a new generation BigDog able to walk on icy terrain and recover its balance when kicked from the side.
2010	The Multi Autonomous Ground-robotic International Challenge has teams of autonomous vehicles map a large dynamic urban environment, identify and track humans and avoid hostile objects.
2016	The Path following of autonomous mobile robot using passive RFID tags is a new method to follow the path using RFID tags. It is proved that the robot always reaches the destination as close as the distance measurement error even if the distance and angular measurements are not exact. It is also capable of choosing right path among multiple paths.
2016	The Multi-Function Agile Remote-Controlled Robot (MARCbot) is for the first time used by US police to kill a sniper who killed 5 police officers in Dallas, Texas, which raises ethical questions regarding the use of drones and robots by police as instruments of lethal force against a perpetrator. During the NASA Sample Return Robot Centennial Challenge, a rover, named Cataglyphis, successfully demonstrated autonomous navigation, decision-making, and sample detection, retrieval, and return capabilities.
2017	Within the ARGOS Challenge robots are developed to work under extreme conditions on offshore oil and gas installations.

== See also ==
- Ant robot
- Autonomous robot
- Autonomous Underwater Vehicle
- DARPA LAGR Program
- Domestic robot
- Humanoid robot
- Hexapod robot
- Industrial robot
- Justin (robot)
- Mobile industrial robots
- Mobile manipulator
- Mobile wireless sensor network
- Personal robot
- Robot
- Robot kit
- Robotic arm
- Robotic mapping
- Robot kinematics
- Rover (space exploration)
- Ubiquitous robot
- Unmanned Aerial Vehicle
- Wi-Fi
