= Workerbot =

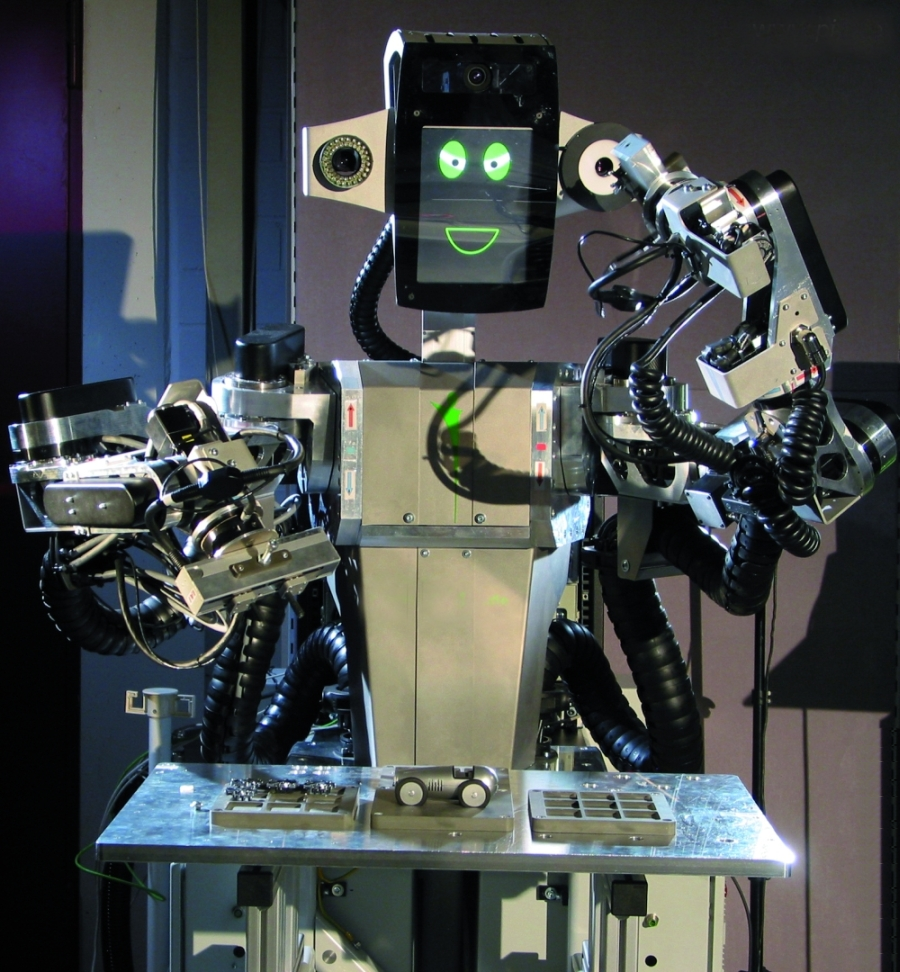
workerbot from pi4_robotics

The workerbot is a trademark, which was developed by the pi4 robotics GmbH to describe an industrial robot, which was modeled with its possibilities of movement and its sensory abilities of a human.

The industrial robot has two arms with seven degrees of freedom. In the arms of force sensors are integrated, enabling the robot to work while the forces occurring measure and similar to humans the gripping process or machining processes to adapt to the forces occurring accordingly. The robot is also equipped with cameras that it can detect its environment and react to it. This industrial robot has been developed within the EU funded project PISA (Flexible Assembly Systems through Workplace-Sharing and Time-Sharing Human-Machine Cooperation). The project consortium consists of the lead company pi4_robotics GmbH and the Fraunhofer IPK, the Universidad Politécnica de Madrid and the company EICAS Automazione S.p.A. .

The aim is to enable the use of highly flexible industrial robots manufacturing companies within the European Union cost production and to prevent the migration to low-wage countries. The workerbot is still the first operative humanoid factory worker worldwide that can be acquired by purchase. In context with the workerbot there is the first webshop for humanoid robots.
