= Ubiquitous robot =

Ubiquitous robot is a term used in an analogous way to ubiquitous computing. Software useful for "integrating robotic technologies with technologies from the fields of ubiquitous and pervasive computing, sensor networks, and ambient intelligence".

The emergence of mobile phone, wearable computers and ubiquitous computing makes it likely that human beings will live in a ubiquitous world in which all devices are fully networked. The existence of ubiquitous space resulting from developments in computer and network technology will provide motivations to offer desired services by any IT device at any place and time through user interactions and seamless applications. This shift has hastened the ubiquitous revolution, which has further manifested itself in the new multidisciplinary research area, ubiquitous robotics. It initiates the third generation of robotics following the first generation of the industrial robot and the second generation of the personal robot.

Ubiquitous robot (Ubibot) is a robot incorporating three components including virtual software robot or avatar, real-world mobile robot and embedded sensor system in surroundings. Software robot within a virtual world can control a real-world robot as a brain and interact with human beings. Researchers of KAIST, Korea describe these three components as a Sobot (Software robot), Mobot (Mobile robot), and Embot (Embedded robot).

== See also ==
- Cloud robotics
- Internet of things
