= Eureka Prometheus Project =

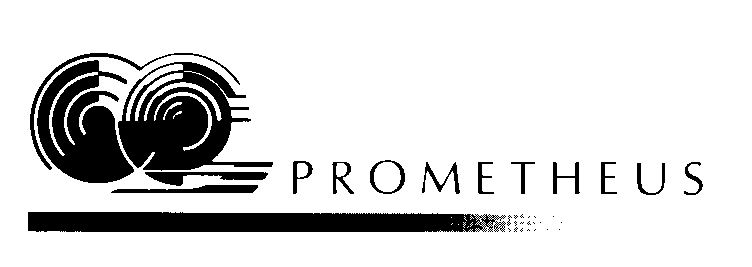
PROMETHEUS logo

The Eureka PROMETHEUS Project (PROgraMme for a European Traffic of Highest Efficiency and Unprecedented Safety, 1987–1995) was the largest R&D project ever in the field of driverless cars. It received €749,000,000 in funding from the EUREKA member states, and defined the state of the art of autonomous vehicles. Numerous universities and car manufacturers participated in this Pan-European project.

In formulating the project, the automotive and industrial partners recognised the need for a wide range of skills and cooperated with over forty research establishments to create a programme consisting of seven sub-projects. Under a steering committee were three projects on industrial research and four on basic research.

Industrial research

- PRO-CAR : Driver assistance by computer systems
- PRO-NET : Vehicle-to-vehicle communication
- PRO-ROAD : Vehicle-to-environment communication

Basic Research

- PRO-ART : Methods and systems of artificial intelligence
- PRO-CHIP: Custom hardware for intelligent processing in vehicles
- PRO-COM : Methods and standards for communication
- PRO-GEN : Traffic scenario for new assessment and introduction of new systems

In 1987, some UK Universities expressed concern that the industrial focus on the project neglected import traffic safety issues such as pedestrian protection. PRO-GEN project leader, the UK Government's Transport and Road Research Laboratory noted that research activities should 'in some way, further the aims of the vehicle companies.

== Results ==
The project culminated in a 'Board Members Meeting' (BMM) on 18–20 October 1994 in Paris. Projects demonstrated ('Common European Demonstrators') were:

CED 1 : Vision Enhancement

CED 2-1 : Friction Monitoring and Vehicle Dynamics

CED 2-2 : Lane Keeping Support

CED 2-3 : Visibility Range Monitoring

CED 2-4 : Driver Status Monitoring

CED 3 : Collision Avoidance

CED 4 : Cooperative Driving

CED 5 : Autonomous Intelligent Cruise Control

CED 6 : Automatic Emergency Call

CED 7 : Fleet Management

CED 9 : Dual Mode Route Guidance

CED 10: Travel and Traffic Information Systems

PROMETHEUS PRO-ART profited from the participation of Ernst Dickmanns, the 1980s pioneer of driverless cars, and his team at Bundeswehr Universität München, collaborating with Daimler-Benz. A first culmination point was achieved in 1994, when their twin robot vehicles VaMP and VITA-2 drove more than 1,000 kilometres (620 mi) on a Paris multi-lane highway in standard heavy traffic at speeds up to 130 kilometres per hour (81 mph). They demonstrated autonomous driving in free lanes, convoy driving, automatic tracking of other vehicles, and lane changes left and right with autonomous passing of other cars.

== Participants ==
There were upwards of 600 commercial members that participated in some way in the Prometheus Project, however, notable ones include

- Aeritalia
- Aerospatiale
- ASEA-Brown-Bovei
- BASF
- BMW
- Bosch
- British Aerospace
- Bull
- CASA
- CGE
- Fiat
- GEC
- Imperial Chemicals, Inc.
- ICL
- Italtel
- Matra
- MBB
- Mercedes
- Montedison
- Nokia
- Olivetti
- Peugeot
- Philips
- Plessey
- Renault
- Saab
- SGS-Thompson
- Siemens
- Thomson
- Volkswagen
- Volvo

In addition to commercial participation, there were multiple countries that assisted with the project. These include

- France
- Germany
- Italy
- Spain
- The UK
- The Netherlands
- Sweden
- Austria
- Belgium
- Denmark
- Norway
- Switzerland
- Finland
- Portugal
- Greece
- Ireland
- Luxembourg
- Turkey
- Yugoslavia
- Iceland
- Canada
- The United States
- Hungary

== See also ==
- Driverless car
- DARPA Grand Challenge
- ARGO Project on autonomous cars
- ELROB trials
- Grand Cooperative Driving Challenge 2011, International Competition
