= Intelligent manufacturing systems =

Modern industrial robotics refers to the use of industrial robotic systems that integrate artificial intelligence, advanced sensing, connectivity and data-driven control within manufacturing and industrial environments particularly in the context of Industry 4.0 and smart factories. Unlike earlier generations of Industrial robot that were typically programmed for fixed, repetitive tasks, modern industrial robotics emphasizes adaptability, autonomy and system-level integration across production workflows.

According to the International Federation of Robotics (IFR), more than 4 million industrial robots were operating in factories worldwide as of 2024. It reflects sustained global adoption of advanced automation technologies. Academic and industry literature increasingly treats modern industrial robotics as a distinct phase in the evolution of industrial automation which shaped by cyber–physical systems, real-time data exchange and networked production environments.

== Distinction from traditional industrial robots ==
The classical Industrial robot is generally described by preprogrammed trajectories, limited sensors and isolated operation in secured work cells while state-of-the-art industrial robotics now includes real-time sensing with vision, force and environment sensors. The adaptive control by means of machine learning, feedback control systems, networking by use of industrial Ethernet, cloud systems, edge computing, human robot collaboration as well as mobile robotic systems that enable robots to work effectively in a dynamic environment which interacts with human operator collaboration and provides adaptive manufacturing solutions by changing rigid automation chains.

== Enabling technologies ==
=== Artificial intelligence and machine learning ===
Machine learning techniques are increasingly applied to robotic perception, motion planning, anomaly detection and predictive maintenance. AI enabled systems can adjust task parameters based on sensor feedback, detect defects and optimize production performance using historical and real-time data.

=== Sensing and perception ===
Modern industrial robots employ multimodal sensing which includes 2D and 3D vision, LiDAR, force–torque sensors and tactile sensing. These capabilities support object recognition, adaptive grasping and operation in unstructured or variable environments.

=== Connectivity and cyber–physical systems ===
Industrial robot are increasingly embedded within cyber physical production systems which enables communication with manufacturing execution systems, digital twins and other machines. Industrial Internet of Things (IIoT) architectures and low latency communication support coordinated multi-robot operations.

=== Digital twins and simulation ===
Digital twin technology allows virtual replicas of robots and production systems to be simulated, monitored and optimized throughout their lifecycle. These models are used for commissioning, fault diagnosis and performance optimization.

== Deployment within Industry 4.0 ==
Modern industrial robotics plays a central role in Industry 4.0 initiatives where automation systems are interconnected and data-driven. Robots operate as part of integrated production networks that support mass customization, real-time optimization and decentralized decision making. Industry studies describe this shift as moving from isolated automation toward smart and self optimizing factories.

== Sector-specific implementations ==
=== Mining automation ===
In mining, robotic and autonomous systems are used for haulage, drilling, material handling and inspection. Autonomous haulage systems integrate GPS, LiDAR, and fleet management software to coordinate vehicles and optimize transport routes which improves safety and equipment utilization. Despite technical and economic challenges such as harsh environments and high capital costs market analyses project continued growth in mining robotics adoption.

=== Food processing and agriculture ===
Robotics in food processing supports handling, cutting, packaging, inspection and palletizing under strict hygiene requirements. Studies report the increasing use of compliant grippers, machine vision and deep learning models to manipulate irregular or fragile food products at industrial speeds. Robotic harvesting and sorting systems are also used in agriculture to improve efficiency and reduce labor intensity.

=== Textile manufacturing ===
Robotic systems are applied to fabric cutting, material handling, inspection and partial sewing automation. Vision guided robots support pattern alignment and defect detection which contributes to higher consistency and reduced material waste in apparel and technical textile production.

=== Chemical, nuclear, and hazardous environments ===
Robots are widely deployed in environments which involves toxic chemicals, extreme temperatures or radiation exposure. Teleoperated and autonomous systems perform inspection, maintenance and material handling tasks in nuclear facilities and in the chemical plants reducing worker exposure to hazardous conditions.

=== Power-plant inspection and maintenance ===
In thermal, hydroelectric and nuclear power plants where robots are used for nondestructive evaluation, turbine inspection, radiation monitoring and confined-space operations. Mobile platforms and crawler robots enable routine inspection while minimizing downtime and safety risks.

=== Logistics and swarm robotics ===
In logistics and warehousing where fleets of Autonomous mobile robots and swarm inspired systems are used for transportation, picking and sorting. Research highlights the scalability and resilience of decentralized robot coordination mainly in large and dynamic warehouse environments.

=== Remanufacturing and recycling ===
Robotics supports circular economy workflows such as automated disassembly, material sorting and component recovery. Vision guided robots are used in electronic waste recycling to improve recovery rates and reduce worker exposure to hazardous materials. Industrial remanufacturing programs also employ robotic refurbishment to extend equipment lifecycles.

=== Welding and additive manufacturing ===
Industrial robots are widely used in automated welding which includes arc, spot and laser welding. Due to their repeatability and precision. Robots are also applied in wire-arc additive manufacturing (WAAM) by enabling the fabrication of large metal components with reduced material waste.

== Economic and workforce implications ==
Industrial robotics contributes to productivity growth, quality improvement and cost reduction. At the same time, automation reshapes labor markets by reducing demand for routine tasks while increasing demand for skills related to robotics, data analysis and system maintenance. International organizations emphasize the importance of education and reskilling to support workforce transitions associated with advanced automation.

== Safety, regulation and standards ==
Modern industrial robotics is governed by international safety standards which includes ISO 10218 for industrial robots and ISO/TS 15066 for Collaborative robot applications. Regulatory bodies such as OSHA and NIOSH provide guidance on risk assessment, safeguarding and human-robot interaction to reduce workplace hazards.

== Sustainability and circular economy ==
Energy efficiency, lifecycle extension and support for recycling and remanufacturing are increasingly emphasized in robotic system design. Industry reports describe efforts to reduce power consumption through optimized motion planning and efficient actuators while supporting sustainable production models.

== See also ==
- Industrial robot
- Industry 4.0
- Autonomous mobile robot
- Collaborative robot
- Smart manufacturing
