= CISBOT =

Cast iron pipe repairing robot

- Manufacturer: ULC Robotics
- Country: United States
- Price: $1 million
- Type: UGV
- Purpose: Pipeline repair

CISBOT (cast-iron sealing robot) is a cast iron pipe-repair robot that seals the joints in natural gas pipelines from the inside, thus extending their use for up to fifty years without unearthing the joints.

== Background ==
Many cast-iron pipes installed over a century ago have joints of jute sealed with lead that deteriorate over time and are often the causes of cast-iron pipe failure. Jute was an effective joint sealant when the pipes carried coal-based town gas, but natural gas, used since the 1950s in New York and the 1970s in the UK, dries out the jute. A fifty-year life expectancy of the new seal has been proven in studies by Cornell University.

== Description ==
CISBOT is 12 inches (300 mm) in diameter, is 35 inches (890 mm) long, weighs 85 pounds (39 kg), and is deployed with a truck containing the control unit, which is attached to the robot with a tether for the power, communication, and control cables, as well as sealant tubing. It is capable of repairing 16–36-inch-diameter (41–91 cm) pipe.

CISBOT is introduced into a pipeline through a 5-by-5-foot (1.5 m × 1.5 m) hole and can repair the joints with an anaerobic sealant for a distance of 1,500 feet (460 m) while the pipe is still in operation. External repair without the robot would require the arranging of temporary gas supply to customers through tanks, purging the pipeline of gas, then digging up each joint, usually every 12 feet (3.7 m), repairing the joint, and re-covering the pipeline. The cost of internal robotic repair is approximately 25% of manual resealing and 10% of total pipeline replacement.

The robot was developed by ULC Robotics of Hauppauge, New York with cooperation from Con Edison and National Grid and costs approximately $1 million. ULC announced the robot in 2015; however it has been in use since at least 2010 and by mid-2012 had sealed over 5000 joints.

CISBOT has been used in the United States in Manhattan, Brooklyn, Staten Island, Rhode Island, and Boston. In Europe, it has been used in London and Glasgow by SGN.

== Operation ==
A flange is first attached to the pipe, through which CISBOT drills an access hole. It then rolls into the pipe and propels itself on two wheels down the pipe. It can travel up to 17 feet (5.2 m) per minute. Upon reaching a joint, it rotates 360° within the pipe to apply the sealant, using its third perpendicular wheel. It drills holes into the joints through which it injects the sealant. It is controlled by two operators monitoring through six cameras. It is equipped with lights and other sensors.

In New York City, CISBOT has discovered foreign objects within gas pipelines, including a baseball and stiletto shoes. It found a 1939 newspaper under Boston's Berkeley Street.

In 2015, CISBOT received a "game changer" award from Robotics Business Review because of its significant improvement in the process used to fix pipe joints.
