= Sascha Stegemann =

Football player in FC Twente (born 1984)

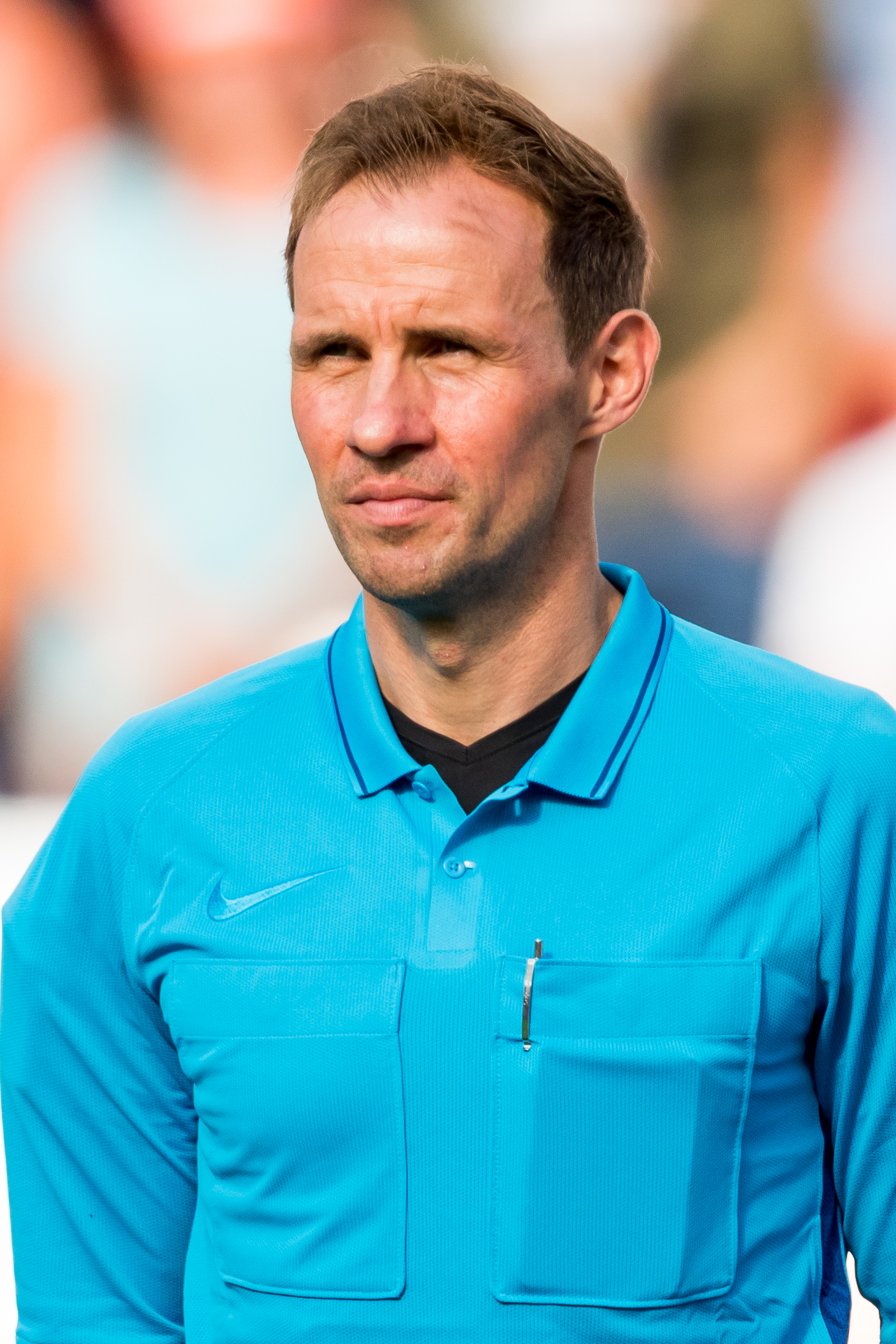
- Stegemann in 2019
- Born: 6 December 1984 (age 41); Niederkassel, West Germany
- Other occupation: Public administrator

Domestic
Years	League	Role
2011–	DFB	Referee
2012–	2. Bundesliga	Referee
2014–	Bundesliga	Referee

International
Years	League	Role
2019–	FIFA listed	Referee

Sascha Stegemann (born 6 December 1984) is a German football referee who is based in Niederkassel. He referees for 1. FC Niederkassel of the Middle Rhine Football Association. He is a FIFA referee, and is ranked as a UEFA first category referee.

== Refereeing career ==
Stegemann, referee of the club 1. FC Niederkassel, has been officiating on the DFB level since 2011. In January 2012, he was included on the DFL list of referees for the 2. Bundesliga. In 2014, Stegemann was promoted to referee in the Bundesliga. Herbert Fandel, Chairman of the DFB Referees' Committee, said that Stegemann is a "clear and courageous official, who will enrich the referee team of the Bundesliga". The nomination was made in light of the fact that in the subsequent years many long-time Bundesliga officials would be retiring due to reaching the age limit.

On 31 August 2014, Stegemann made his Bundesliga debut in the match between Mainz 05 and Hannover 96.

== Personal life ==
Stegemann has a diploma in public administration and has graduated by the first Staatsexamen. Stegemann currently lives in Niederkassel.
