= Niederkassel =

- Town
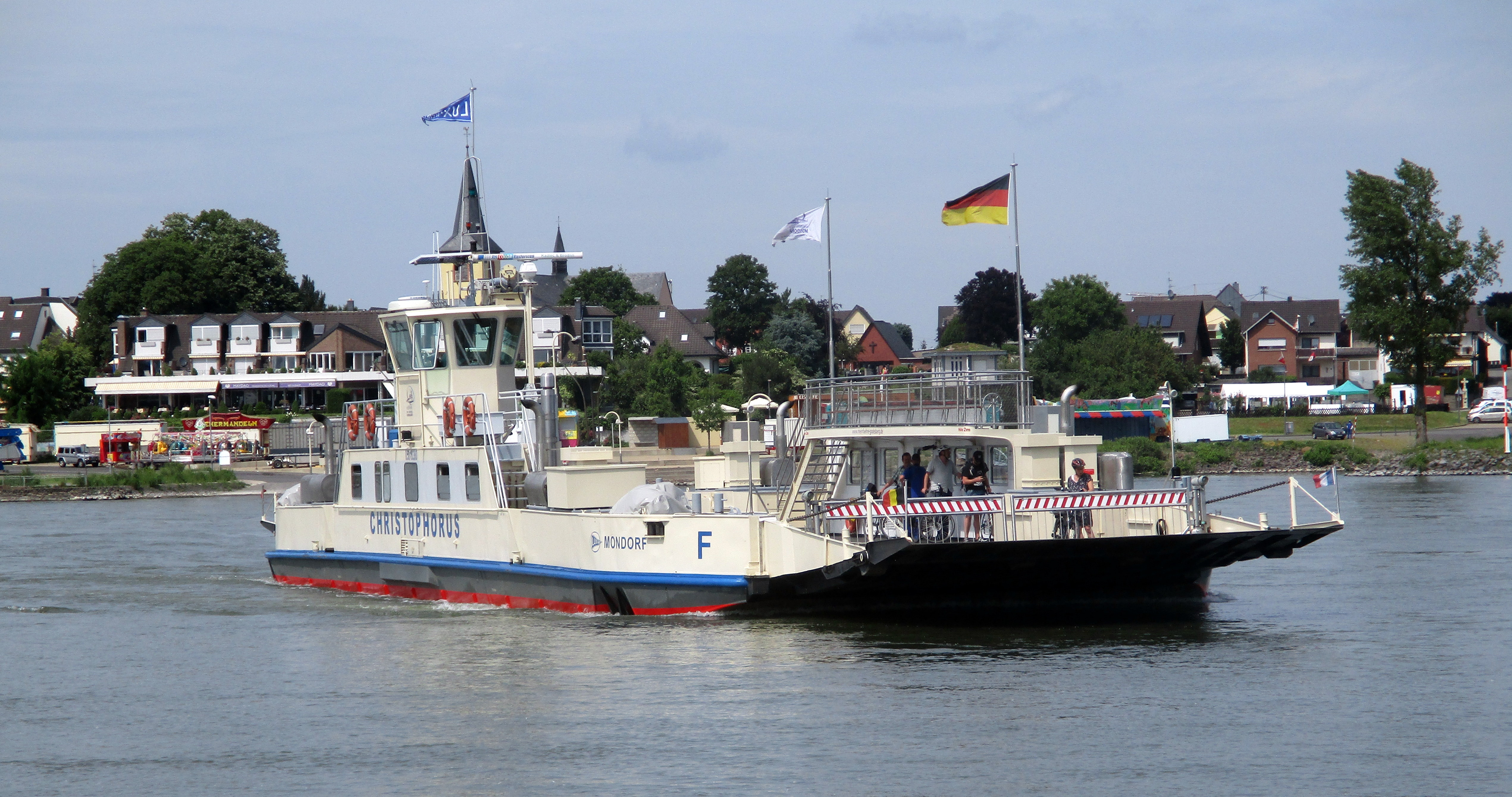
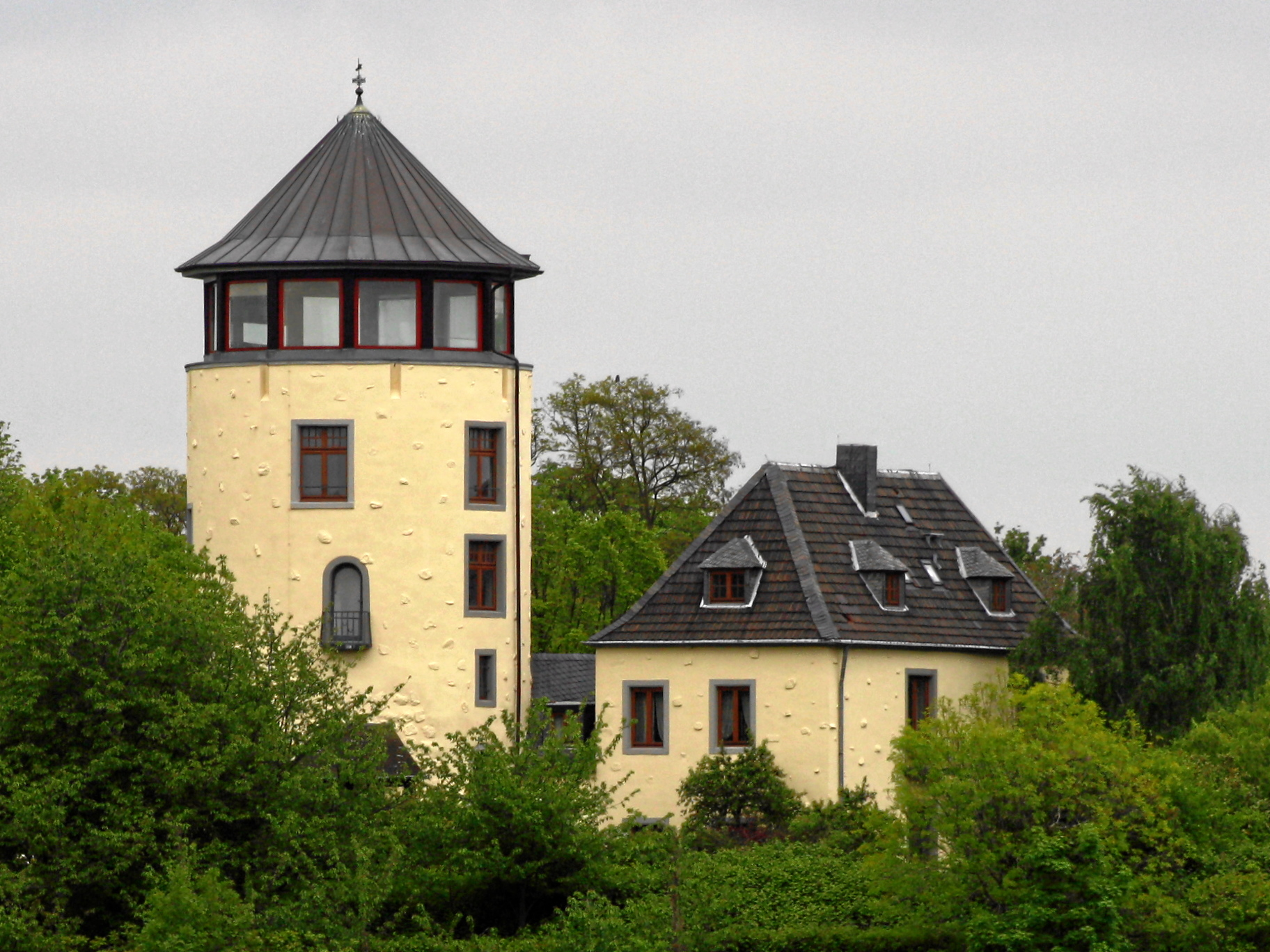
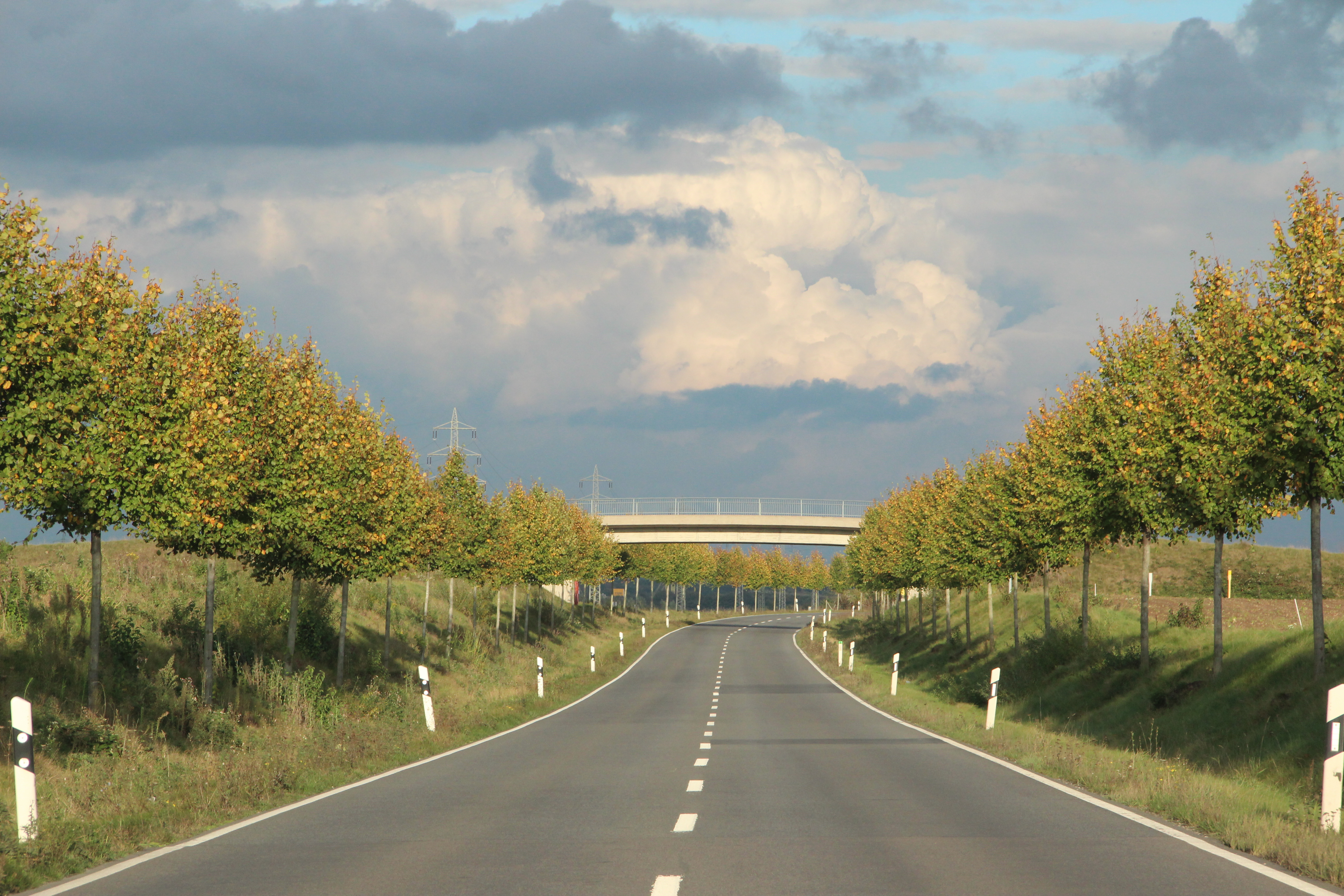

- Coat of arms

- Location of Niederkassel within Rhein-Sieg-Kreis district
- Interactive map of Niederkassel
- Location within Germany Location within North Rhine-Westphalia
- Coordinates: 50°49′N 7°02′E
- Country: Germany
- State: North Rhine-Westphalia
- Admin. region: Köln
- District: Rhein-Sieg-Kreis
- Subdivisions: 7

Government
  - Mayor (2020–25): Stephan Vehreschild (CDU)

Area
  - Total: 35.79 km^{2} (13.82 sq mi)
- Elevation: 55 m (180 ft)

Population (2025-12-31)
  - Total: 38,357
  - Density: 1,072/km^{2} (2,776/sq mi)
- Time zone: UTC+01:00 (CET)
  - Summer (DST): UTC+02:00 (CEST)
- Postal codes: 53859
- Dialling codes: 02208; 0228
- Vehicle registration: SU
- Website: www.niederkassel.de

Niederkassel (German pronunciation: [ˌniːdɐˈkasl̩]; Ripuarian: Neddekaaßel) is a town in the Rhein-Sieg district, in North Rhine-Westphalia, Germany, with a population of around 37,000 people. It is situated on the right bank of the Rhine, approx. 10 km (6 mi) north-east of Bonn and 15 km (9 mi) south-east of Cologne. Niederkassel is subdivided into seven quarters (from the south to the north): Mondorf, Rheidt, Niederkassel, Uckendorf, Stockem, Lülsdorf and Ranzel. People can walk next to the river Rhine in Lülsdorf, Niederkassel and Rheidt.

== Population ==
Historical population

Year	Pop.	±% p.a.
1965	14,580	—
1970	20,616	+7.17%
1975	24,319	+3.36%
1980	25,990	+1.34%
1985	27,485	+1.12%
1990	29,240	+1.25%
1995	31,201	+1.31%

Year	Pop.	±% p.a.
2000	34,613	+2.10%
2005	36,516	+1.08%
2010	37,552	+0.56%
2015	37,583	+0.02%
2020	38,512	+0.49%
2025	38,357	−0.08%

Source: Landesdatabank Nordrhein-Westfalen

== Twin towns – sister cities ==
Niederkassel is twinned with:

- Limassol, Cyprus
- Premnitz, Germany

== Notable people ==
- Ernst Dickmanns (born 1936), engineer, pioneer of dynamic computer vision and of driverless cars
- Stephan Engels (born 1960), football player and coach
- Sascha Stegemann (born 1984), football referee
