= Berkeley Street Historic District =

Historic district in Massachusetts, United States

- U.S. National Register of Historic Places
- U.S. Historic district
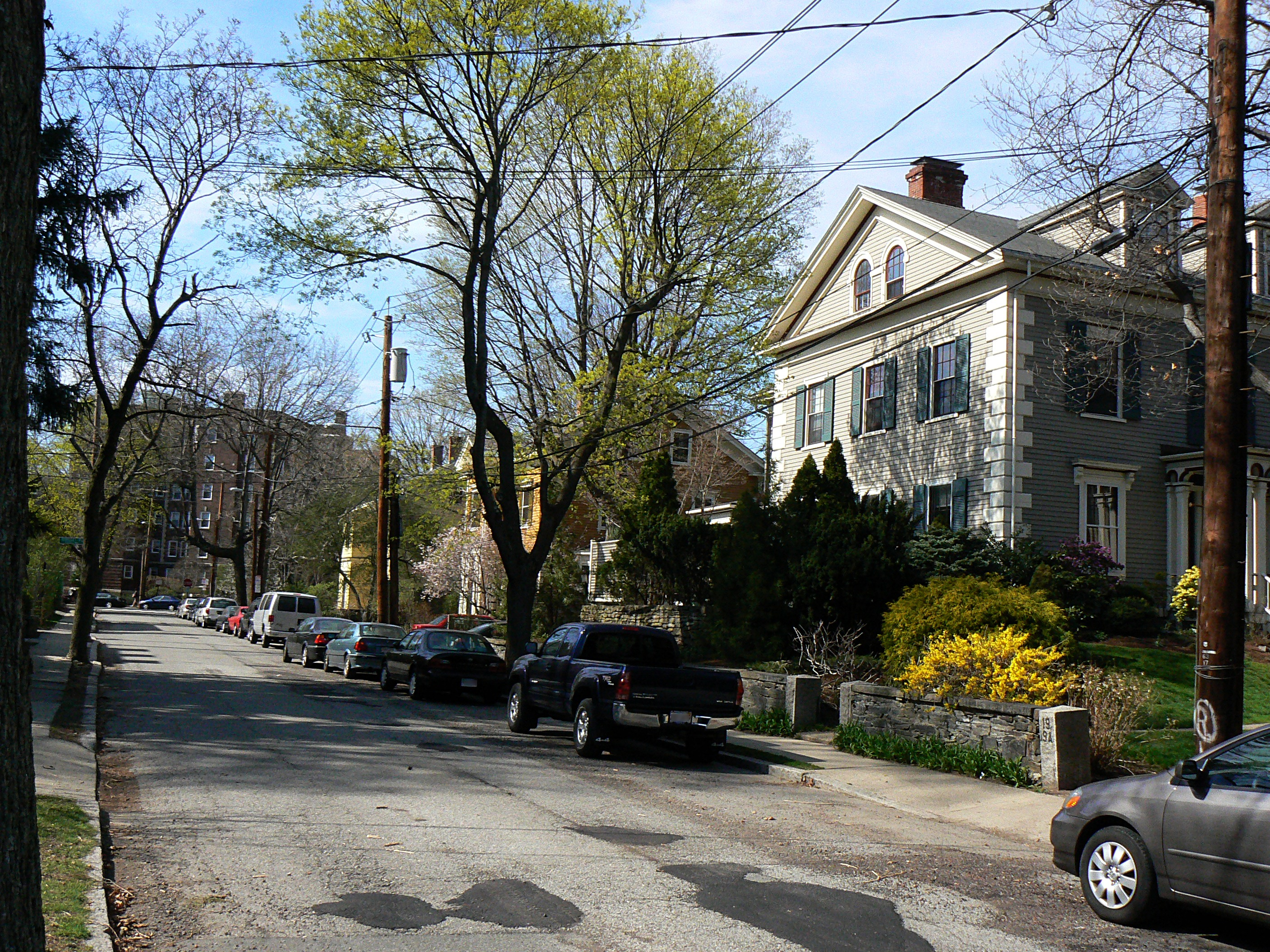
- Berkeley Street

- Location within Massachusetts Location within the United States
- Location: Berkeley St. and Berkeley Pl., Cambridge, Massachusetts
- Coordinates: 42°22′40″N 71°7′32″W
- Area: 4.9 acres (2.0 ha) (original size); 7.2 acres (2.9 ha) (after 1986 increase)
- Built: 1852
- Architectural style: Late Victorian, Italian Villa
- MPS: Cambridge MRA
- NRHP reference No.: 82001920 (original); 86001265 (increase)

Significant dates
- Added to NRHP: April 13, 1982
- Boundary increase: May 19, 1986

The Berkeley Street Historic District is a historic district on Berkeley Street and Berkeley Place in Cambridge, Massachusetts. It encompasses a neighborhood containing one of the greatest concentrations of fine Italianate and Second Empire houses in the city. It was listed on the National Register of Historic Places in 1982, with a substantial increase in 1986.

== Description and history ==
Berkeley Street is located west of Cambridge Common in western Cambridge, running parallel to and south of Concord Avenue between Craigie Street and Garden Street. Land in this area was acquired by Harvard University professor Joseph Worcester in 1843, and laid out for subdivision in 1852. Most of the houses on Berkeley Street were built between 1852 and 1872, for people prominent in business, culture, and politics. Berkeley Place, a dead end street projecting southerly from Berkeley Street, was laid out in 1890; it was originally a back lane to the Longfellow House, which was Worcester's home in the 1840s. Most of its houses date to the period between 1892 and 1918.

When the district was first listed on the National Register of Historic Places in 1982, it included 15 properties on Berkeley Street. Most of these houses are in the fashionable Bracketed Italianate style of that time, with a number of examples of the Second Empire style. A few later houses, built in the Queen Anne style, are sympathetic to the earlier houses in massing and style. Four years later the district was expanded to include most of the properties on Berkeley Place. Stylistically, they are a cross-section of styles fashionable at that time: Queen Anne, Shingle, and Colonial Revival.

== See also ==
- National Register of Historic Places listings in Cambridge, Massachusetts
