= VaMP =

The VaMP driverless car was one of the first autonomous cars along with its twin vehicle, the VITA-2. They were able to drive in heavy traffic for long distances without human intervention, using computer vision to recognize rapidly moving obstacles such as other cars, and automatically avoid and pass them.

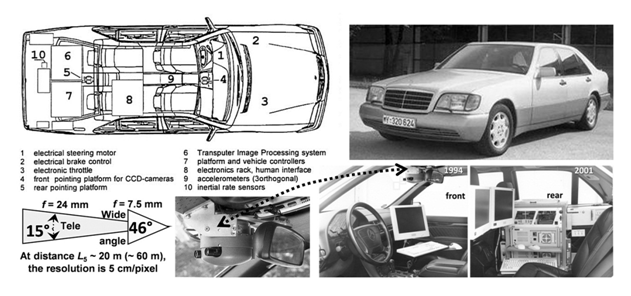
The experimental driverless car VaMP (Versuchsfahrzeug für autonome Mobilität und Rechnersehen) which was developed in the context of the European research project PROMETHEUS: (top left) components for autonomous driving; (right) VaMP and view into passenger cabin (lower right); (lower left) bifocal camera arrangement (front) on yaw platform

The VaMP was constructed by the team of Ernst Dickmanns at the University of the Bundeswehr Munich and Mercedes-Benz in the 1990s as part of the 800 million ECU EUREKA Prometheus Project on autonomous vehicles (1987–1995). It was a Mercedes 500 SEL re-engineered to control steering wheel, throttle, and brakes through computer commands based on real-time evaluation of image sequences. Software translated sensory data into appropriate driving commands. Due to the limited computing power of the time, sophisticated computer vision strategies were necessary to react in real time. The Dickmanns team solved the problem through an innovative approach to dynamic computer vision. Attention control including artificial saccadic movements of the platform carrying the cameras allowed the system to focus its attention on the most relevant details of the visual input. Four cameras with two different focal lengths for each hemisphere were used in parallel for this purpose. Kalman filters were extended to handle perspective imaging and to achieve robust autonomous driving even in the presence of noise and uncertainty. Sixty transputers, a type of parallel computers, were used to deal with the enormous (by 1990s standards) computational demands.

In 1994, the VaMP and its twin VITA-2 were stars of the final international presentation of the PROMETHEUS project in October 1994. With a safety driver and guests on board, the twins drove more than 1,000 km (620 mi) in normal traffic on the three-lane highway at speeds up to 130 km/h (81 mph). They demonstrated lane changes left and right, autonomously passing other cars after maneuver approval by the safety driver.

One year later, the autonomous Mercedes-Benz drove more than 1,000 miles (2,000 km) from Munich to Copenhagen and back in traffic at up to 180 km/h (110 mph), again planning and executing maneuvers to pass other cars. In a few critical situations (such as unmodeled construction areas) the safety driver took over. The car achieved speeds exceeding 175 km/h (109 mph) on the German Autobahn, with a mean distance between human interventions of 9 km (5.6 mi). It covered up to 158 km (98 mi) without any human intervention.

The VaMP did not use GPS, and relied on vision only.

In May 2006, VaMP went on display at the Deutsches Museum in Munich, Germany.

== See also ==
- Driverless car
- VIAC the Intercontinental Autonomous Challenge of 2010
- EUREKA Prometheus Project
- DARPA Grand Challenge
- ELROB trials
