= Workcell =

A workcell is an arrangement of resources in a manufacturing environment to improve the quality, speed and cost of the process. Workcells are designed to improve these by improving process flow and eliminating waste. They are based on the principles of Lean Manufacturing as described in The Machine That Changed the World by Womack, Jones and Roos.

== History ==
Classical manufacturing management approaches dictate that costs be lowered by breaking the process into steps, and ensuring that each of these steps minimizes cost and maximizes efficiency. This discrete approach has resulted in machines placed apart from each other to maximize the efficiency and throughput of each machine. The traditional accounting for machine capitalization is based on the number of parts produced, and this approach reinforces the idea of lowering the cost of each machine (by having them produce as many parts as possible.) Increasing the number of parts (WIP) adds waste in areas such as Inventory and Transportation.

Large amounts of excess Inventory often now accumulate between the machines in the process for reasons to do with 'unbalanced' line capacities and batch processing. In addition, the parts must now be transported between the machines. An increase in the number of machines involved also will reduce each worker's multi-skilling proficiency (since that would need them to learn how to operate multiple machines, and they too will need to move between those machines.)

Lean Manufacturing focuses on optimizing the end-to-end process as a whole. This enables a focus in the process on creating a finished product at the lowest cost (instead of lowering the cost of each step.) A common approach to achieving this is known as the workcell. Machines involved in building a product are placed next to each other to minimize transportation of both parts and people (an L-shaped desk with upper shelves is a good office example, which enables many types of office equipment to be within the reach of a worker). This will minimize waste in both transportation and in the storage of excess inventory.

At first glance, lean workcells may appear to be similar to traditional workcells, but they are inherently different. For instance, lean workcells must be designed for minimal wasted motion, which refers to any unnecessary time and effort required to assemble a product. Excessive twists or turns, uncomfortable reaches or pickups, and unnecessary walking all contribute to wasted motion and may put error inducing stress upon the operator. Workcells can often be reconfigured easily to allow the adaptation of the process to fit takt time. This flexibility allows the work content to be adapted as demand or product mix changes.

Another Lean approach is to aim to have flexible manufacturing through small production lot sizes since this smooths production. Small lot sizes usually increases transportation waste, but this can be eliminated if machines are back-to-back in a workcell.

== Implementation ==
The implementation of workcells can reduce costs by an order of magnitude (90%).

In software development, the core of the workcell is the cross-functional team. This team differs from a more traditional waterfall team:

	WATERFALL	CROSS-FUNCTIONAL
Team composition	Separate roles	Cross-functional
Steps are	One at a time	Integrated
Size of steps	Large	Small
Focus is on	Completing step	Quality
Team work	Present only at boundaries of tasks	Present all the time
Optimization Level	Individual Parts	the Whole
