= Machine tending =

Industrial automation process

Machine tending is the automated servicing of industrial machine tools in manufacturing environments. The primary function of a machine-tending system is to load workpieces into CNC machining and unload finished parts after processing. In many manufacturing systems, machine-tending systems may also perform related tasks including inspection, cleaning, deburring, or packaging.

== Robotic Machine Tending ==
Primarily a resource-planning and control problem within manufacturing systems, robotic machine tending is a coordinated interaction between manufacturing resources, such as grippers, fixtures, and machine tools, acting upon workpieces during loading and unloading operations.
