= Technology Shabbat =

No technology day

Technology Shabbat or Tech Shabbat is a term coined in 2010 by Tiffany Shlain and Ken Goldberg to describe a day of rest or cessation from the use of all technology with screens: smartphones, personal computers, tablets and television. Shlain introduced the concept, modeled on the traditional Jewish Shabbat, in a series of articles and films after participating in The National Day of Unplugging, an event sponsored by nonprofit think tank Reboot.

== History ==
The concept of a taking time to disconnect from technology emerged early in the development of the internet. Secretary of State George Shultz, for example, spent an hour each week in quiet reflection with only a pen and paper. Since the advent of portable devices, increasing numbers of people have adopted the practice.

Shlain herself first disconnected in 2008, when her father Leonard Shlain was diagnosed with brain cancer, prompting her to turn off her cell phone during his moments of lucidity. With her husband Ken Goldberg, she participated in the first annual National Day of Unplugging, to which she contributed a poem she subsequently turned into the film Yelp: With Apologies to Allen Ginsberg's 'Howl'.

== Rituals ==
All screens are turned off for twenty-four hours, often from Friday night until Saturday night. Suggested activities include reading, taking walks, visiting new neighborhoods, engaging in outdoor activities, and using pen and paper.

== Filmography ==
The concept of Technology Shabbat has been featured in several of Shlain's films: Connected: An Autoblogography About Love, Death, & Technology (2011), Yelp: With Apologies to Allen Ginsberg's 'Howl' (2011), Technology Shabbats (2013), A Case For Dreaming (2014), and Making of a Mensch (2015).

== See also ==
- Sabbath mode
