= Redemptive violence =

Redemptive violence is defined as a belief that "violence is a useful mechanism for control and order", or, alternately, a belief in "using violence to rid and save the world from evil". The French Revolution involved violence that was depicted as redemptive by revolutionaries, and decolonization theorist Frantz Fanon was an advocate of redemptive violence. Pacifism rejects the idea that violence can be redemptive.

== Myth ==
The myth of redemptive violence is the story of the victory of order over chaos by means of violence. It is the ideology of conquest, the gods favour those who conquer.

Today’s common understanding of the Myth of Redemptive Violence was put forward by American scholar and theologian Walter Wink in his book, The Powers that Be: Theology for a New Millennium, wherein he defines the Myth of Redemptive Violence as “the belief that violence saves, that war brings peace, that might makes right.”

== Domination system ==
Redemptive violence is the means by which the powers that be support the Domination System; another term coined by Walter Wink. The domination system is described as a network of oppressive relations such as classism, racism, and sexism and the role that violence plays in preserving them. “It is characterized by unjust economic relations, oppressive political relations, biased race relations, patriarchal gender relations, hierarchical power relations, and the use of violence to maintain them all.”

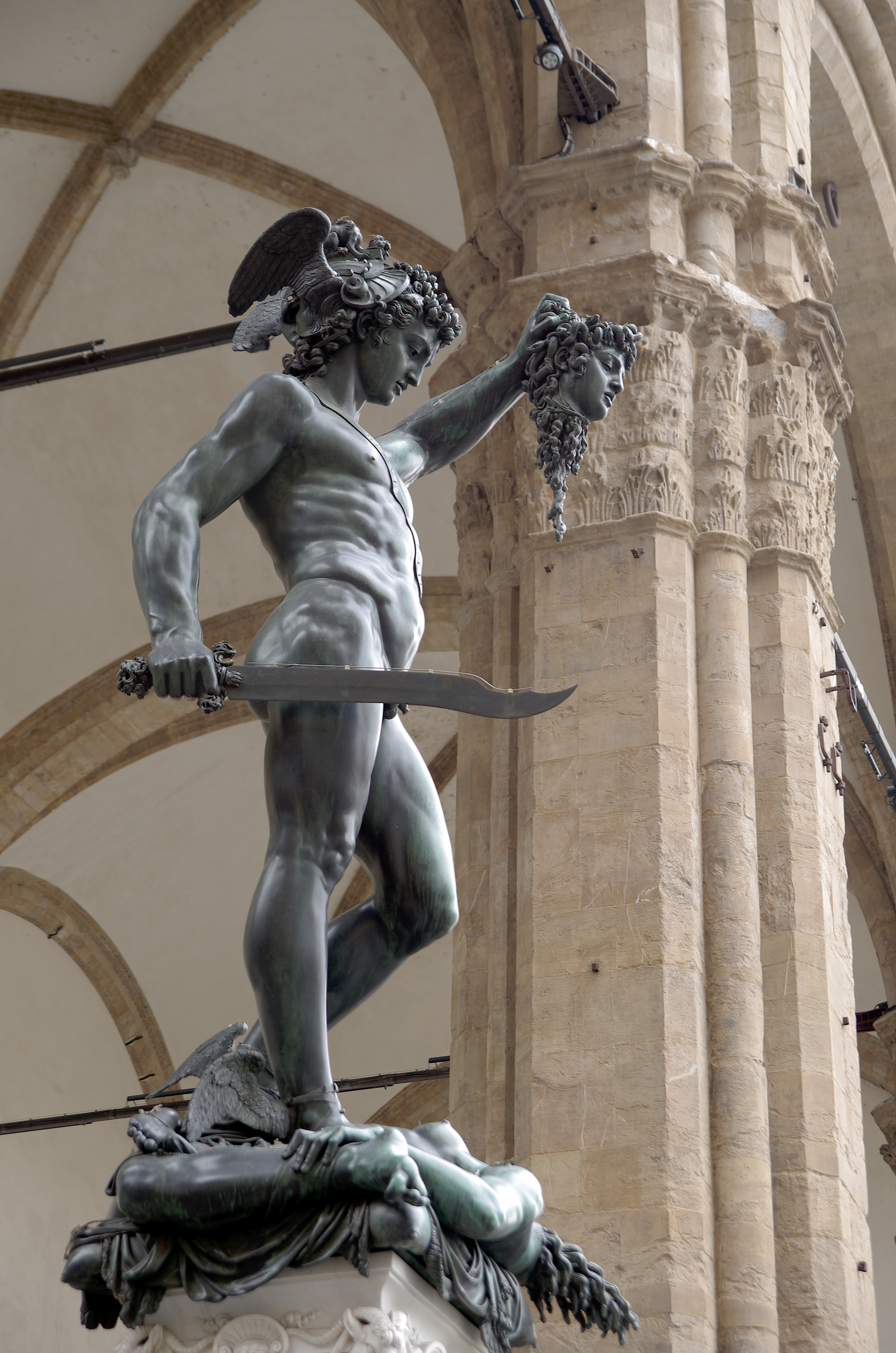
Sculpture of Perseus holding up the severed head of Medusa

== In early history ==
The myth of redemptive violence can be traced all the way back into biblical times. For instance, the Babylonian creation story from 1250 BCE follows the same blueprint as virtually every story of redemptive violence put forward today. In this story, known as the Enuma Elish, the god Marduk, defeats the god Tiamat in a fierce battle, and then creates the world using her body. He then uses the blood of another slain god, Qingu to create humans.

Depictions of redemptive violence can also be seen in various art forms throughout early human history.

== In modern culture ==
In describing the Myth of Redemptive Violence, Walter Wink points to the popular 1950s cartoon, Popeye and Bluto, describing the basic plot that is repeated in nearly every episode.

“In a typical segment, Bluto abducts a screaming and kicking Olive Oyl, Popeye’s girlfriend. When Popeye attempts to rescue her, the massive Bluto beats his diminutive opponent to a pulp, while Olive Oyl helplessly wrings her hands. At the last moment, as our hero oozes to the floor, and Bluto is trying, in effect, to rape Olive Oyl, a can of spinach pops from Popeye’s pocket and spills into his mouth. Transformed by this gracious infusion of power, he easily demolishes the villain and rescues his beloved. The format never varies. Neither party ever gains any insight or learns from these encounters. They never sit down and discuss their differences. Repeated defeats do not teach Bluto to honour Olive Oyl’s humanity, and repeated pummellings do not teach Popeye to swallow his spinach before the fight.”

— Walter Wink, The Powers that Be: Theology for a New Millenium

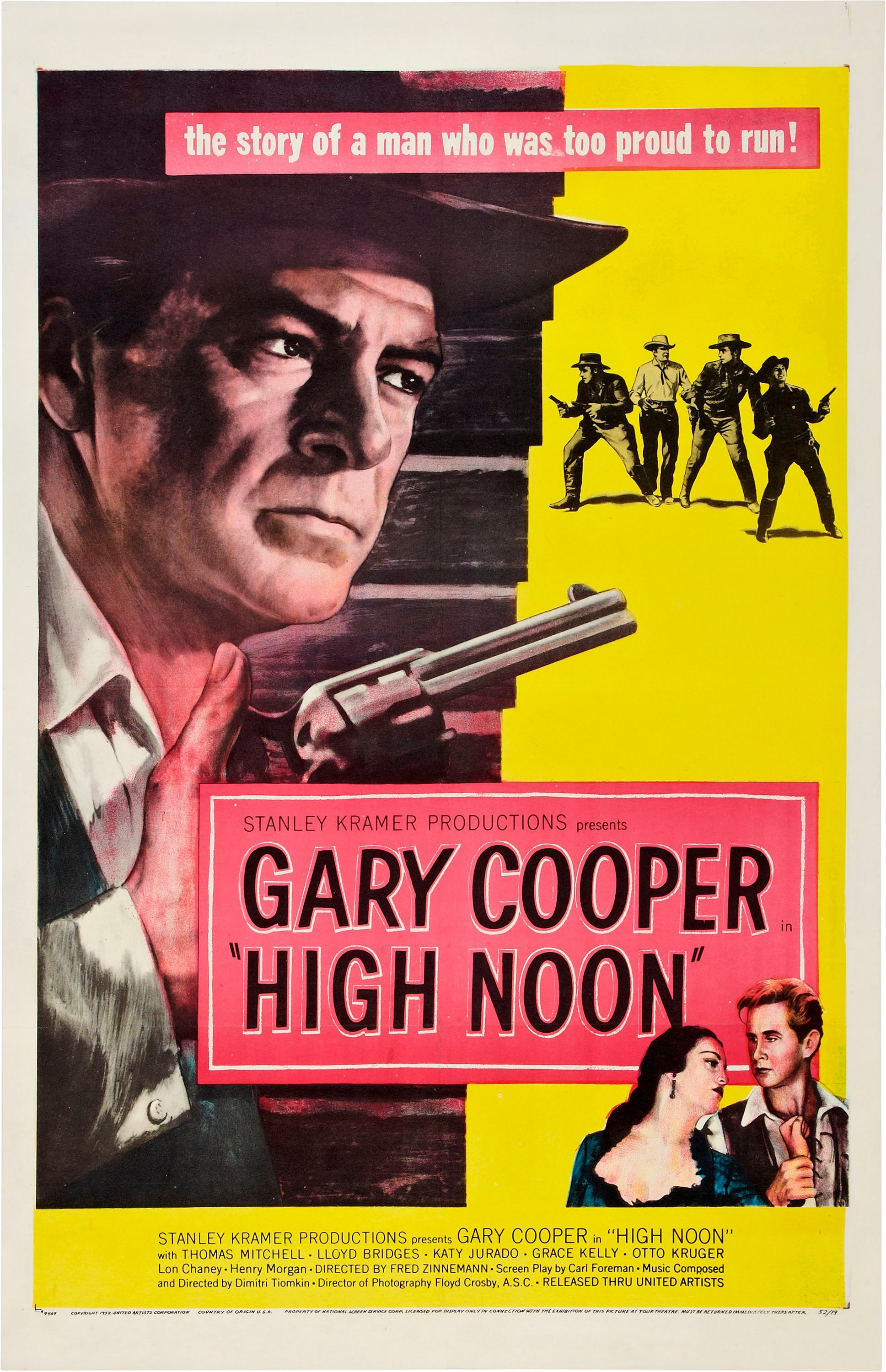
High Noon (1952 poster)

Wink points out that no matter what happens, Popeye continues to use violence as the only means of solving problems because he never learns that there is another option. He sees violence as a necessity; as the only possible way to solve a problem, and never learns that any other method would solve the problem.

== See also ==
- Culture of violence
- Dominator culture
- Eye for an eye
- Flagellant
- Gratification
- Heroic bloodshed
- Just war theory
- Kyriarchy
- Male warrior hypothesis
- Mirror punishment
- Mortification of the flesh
- Myth of redemptive violence
- National myth
- Poetic justice
- Redemptive suffering
- Schadenfreude
- Self-flagellation
