= Dominator culture =

Model of societal power and hierarchy

Dominator culture refers to a model of society where fear and force maintain rigid understandings of power and superiority within a hierarchical structure. Futurist and writer Riane Eisler first popularized this term in her book The Chalice and the Blade (HarperCollins San Francisco, 1987). In it, Eisler positions the dominator model in contrast to the partnership model, a more egalitarian structure of society founded on mutual respect among its inhabitants. In dominator culture, men rule over women, whereas partnership culture values men and women equally.

Other theorists, including Terence McKenna and bell hooks, have expanded on the implications and impact of dominator culture. They, among others, argue that adherence to the dominator model over the partnership model denies the possibility of a more equal society, systematically allowing for the persecution of those who are "dominated"—including racial and ethnic minorities, LGBT people, and women.

== Concept and terminology ==
Riane Eisler presents dominator culture as a cultural construction of the roles and relations of women and men, where men "dominate", or are in control within society. Regardless of the location, time period, religious beliefs, or advancements in technology, a society might follow the dominator culture model. Eisler characterizes dominator culture as featuring four core elements:

- an authoritarian social and family structure
- rigid male dominance
- a high level of violence and abuse
- and a system of beliefs that normalizes such a society

The dominator model is framed in contrast to the partnership model. In a sort of reversal of the elements of dominator culture, the partnership model is characterized by:

- organization according to the ideals of a democratic structure
- equal partnership between men and women
- a lack of tolerance for abuse and violence
- and belief systems that validate an empathetic perspective

By juxtaposing dominator culture with partnership culture, Eisler creates a continuum between the two. She argues that where a society falls on this spectrum influences its culture, beliefs, and actions. Adherence to dominator culture affects people from a personal to a public level, as seen in its societal impact.

=== Historical context ===
The prevalence of dominator culture has shifted over time. Eisler claims that, in the prehistory of humans, partnership used to be the norm. In both the Paleolithic and Neolithic periods, there are examples of matriarchal societies preceding patriarchies. British archaeologist James Mellaart, for example, reported a Neolithic site with many female images and no signs of destructive warfare for almost 1000 years. For thousands of years, people lived in these peaceful partnership societies, until warlike nomadic tribes disrupted the balance with their dominator cultures. Since then, fluctuations between dominator and partnership societies have occurred over time, but the primary shift has been towards dominator culture.

== Societal impact ==
Dominator culture impacts the way a society appears and functions. Eisler posits that "narratives about our cultural origins", like dominator culture, "reflect and guide how we think, feel, and act." Though no culture is fully dominator or fully partnership in its construction, the degree to which it aligns with one of these models impacts the beliefs, institutions, and relationships of that society.

=== Gender inequalities ===
The main distinction between the dominator and partnership models, according to Eisler, is their treatment of the relationships between men and women. She argues that, historically, men have been the dominators, leading to patriarchal society that upholds constricting, traditional gender roles. Surveys by anthropologists Peggy R. Sanday and Scott Coltrane support this connection, showing the correlation between a society's structure and the expectations for men and women. They found that greater equality between men and women led to greater male involvement in childcare. However, because dominator culture upholds a harsh division between masculinity and femininity, it dissociates masculinity from anything stereotypically feminine—even at the expense of benefits such as those reported by Sanday and Coltrane. Accordingly, in these societies that prize domination and power, the societal value for qualities like empathy, caregiving, and nonviolence diminishes. Instead, by viewing femininity as undesirable and inferior, these dominator societies accept and perpetuate violent and inequitable behavior.

=== Power disparities ===
In dominator culture, society reinforces such hierarchies by presenting the dominator model as the natural order of society. According to Eisler, some sociobiologists and psychologists claim that male dominance is inherent in human genes and a product of evolution, demonstrating dominator thinking. Theorist bell hooks has expanded on this, indicating that dominator culture "teaches us that we are all natural-born killers but that males are more able to realize the predator role." By accepting male dominance as a genetic imperative, society justifies a dominator structure. Consequently, this situates the desire to overpower and control others as part of human identity, according to hooks.

This hierarchical disparity is not only explained genetically but societally reinforced, extending to "power" more generally. Although Eisler often distinguishes between the two models on the basis of gender, she also applies these hierarchies more broadly to other societal constructions of power, like race, class, and age. Terence McKenna, a friend of Eisler's and fellow writer, asserts that Eisler's book The Chalice and the Blade "de-genderized the terminology", framing it as a contrast between dominator and partnership ideologies, rather than just an indictment of patriarchy. Supporting this interpretation, Eisler argues that society's requirement of children to be submissive and obedient to their parents reflects the influence of dominator culture. Dominator culture encourages the ideology, from childhood, that one either dominates or is dominated. Accordingly, dominator culture not only equates the difference between men and women to superiority and inferiority, but rather "frame[s] all relationships as power struggles."

== Historical and cultural implications ==
Dominator culture has had varying manifestations in society throughout the course of human history, from the prehistoric warlike tribes of the Neolithic era to present-day displays. The dominator structure of society dictates and shapes the culture that accompanies it. Other authors have used, expanded on, and interpreted Eisler's idea of dominator culture to apply it to a wide range of fields, as far-reaching as nursing, war, language learning, economics, and ecofeminism.

=== Historical and cultural manifestations ===
Author Malcolm Hollick cites Nazi Germany, Stalinist Russia, and Islamic fundamentalist states as modern, though severe, examples of dominator societies. The Nazi claim to power, for example, was also accompanied by the call for women's return to "traditional", or subservient, places in family structures. However, manifestations of dominator culture are not always so extreme; the effects of dominator culture often manifest in pervasive and subtle ways in society. In the United States, the wars on terror, drugs, and crime perpetuate the use of force to achieve an end and indicate a lessening of certain freedoms. On a larger scale, sex-slavery, forced marriage, and the acceptance of wife-beating persist around the world. Though the Western world has made considerable strides towards a more partnership society in the past few centuries—Western society boasts of freedom of speech, access to education, political participation, gay rights, and women in the workforce—the shift towards the partnership model is neither universal nor complete.

Similarly, dominator culture threatens the preservation of the environment. Hierarchical societies that value claiming control justify humans' claims of dominion over nature. McKenna expanded on Eisler's work, using the idea of dominator culture to illuminate the character of what he sees as Western patriarchal culture—indicating, for example, his claims that it perennially lacks social conscience and lacks concern for the environment. He argues that, "The entire structure of dominator culture ... is based upon our alienation from nature, from ourselves, and from each other." As a result, dominator culture not only accepts but justifies the pollution and destruction of the environment. Daniel Quinn, a philosophical and environmental writer, takes on these issues in his novel Ishmael, characterizing dominator culture as Taker culture and detailing its incompatibility with the environment.

The term has been used and expanded upon by other writers, such as

- Carol J. Adams in The Sexual Politics of Meat: A Feminist-Vegetarian Critical Theory (1990)
- Fritjof Capra in The Turning Point (1982)
- Thom Hartmann in The Last Hours of Ancient Sunlight (1999)
- Leonard Shlain in The Alphabet Versus the Goddess (1998)
- Starhawk in Dreaming the Dark (1982)
- bell hooks in Teaching Community: A Pedagogy of Hope (2003)
- Walter Wink in Engaging the Powers: Discernment and Resistance in a World of Domination (1992) and other books on the Myth of Redemptive Violence

=== Consequences for the future ===
Despite the stability and fairness characteristic of partnership society, dominator culture often still takes precedence. Eisler argues that blindly accepting dominator culture as part of the genetic, natural order of the world excuses human responsibility. When people understand dominator culture as a genetic imperative, they ignore environmental influences, including parenting. This perpetuates the cycle of dominator culture and ignores scientific findings that contradict the supposedly genetic nature of violence. By accepting dominator culture as the norm, people discount their own claim to agency. However, in her article "Love as the Practice of Freedom", bell hooks offers a potential counter to dominator culture. She states that love—the "longing to connect with someone radically different"—led people to overcome dominator thinking in action, whether the issue was "ending racism, sexism, homophobia, or class elitism." Ultimately, Eisler acknowledges that cultural transformation does not happen on its own; however, she asserts, "Many of us worldwide are working for cultural transformation, for a shift to a more peaceful, equitable, and sustainable way of relating to one another and our Mother Earth."

== See also ==
- Androcracy
- Cultural imperialism
- Dominion (political theory)
- Dominion theology, various Protestant Christian political ideologies which seek to institute a nation governed by Christians
- Dominium mundi, the idea of universal dominion developed in the Middle Ages
- Egalitarianism
- Shared earning/shared parenting marriage
