= Cultural transformation theory =

Theory of societal development and organization

Cultural transformation theory proposes that societies used to follow a “partnership model” of civilization but over time, it gave way to today's current “dominator model” of civilization. This theory was first proposed by Riane Eisler, a cultural scholar, in her book The Chalice and the Blade. Eisler affirms that societies exist on a partnership-domination continuum but we as a species have moved away from our former partnership orientation to a more domination orientation by uplifting masculine ideals over feminine ideals. She insists that people do not have to live in a society based on the rule of one gender class over the other. There is historical evidence that another type of society, where all individuals are equal, is possible.

The partnership model centers on an egalitarian arrangement. A society where each individual is accepted as equal and feminine values are given just as much importance as masculine values. The hierarchy of power in these societies is very fluid and not maintained through abusive means. In contrast, the dominator model relies heavily upon a strict top-down hierarchy which ranks individuals as superior and inferior, with males often seen as superior over females. The rankings are based upon overpowering others and normally determined through violence. Because of the differing ideals, there is a stark difference between the two models and how each society type treats members of each gender. Because a partnership society values equality of all, men and women are treated with the same amount of respect. Duties are divided up fairly between everyone and no one individual's job is deemed more important than another's. However, dominator societies tend to devaluate jobs performed by women, especially those that involve a significant level of feminine values such as care and compassion.

Eisler proposes that originally, our mainstream culture centered around the partnership model but that following a period of chaos and cultural disruption there occurred a fundamental shift towards the dominator model. The greater availability of archaeological data on ancient civilizations make it possible to document this shift in more detail through the analysis of prehistoric cultural evolution.

== Dominator vs partnership patterns of organization ==
Eisler distinguished four different dimensions that these societies explicitly differ in: social structure, gender relations, emotional, and value beliefs.

=== Social structure ===
Dominator model societies follow a rigid hierarchy system. Certain individuals or groups of individuals are unquestioningly in superior over others. Even daily activities are a power struggle, and often those in power remain in power while those inferior remain inferior. Partnership model societies follow a “hierarchy of actualization”. This means that the wisest person, depending on the situation, is in power. But rather than control the group, they try to empower those who are less experienced so that they may learn as well.

=== Gender relations ===
In dominator model societies, males generally rank above females because they tend to express more masculine values, like conquest and control. Males are typically more power-oriented than females and so are at a biological advantage. To even further divide the two genders, children are also taught at a young age that they are different from each other. When playing, if a girl is too rough she'll be more likely to get scolded than if she were a boy. Common sayings like “boys will be boys” and “you should be more ladylike” train children that girls are not allowed to do the same things boys can do. The division only becomes more apparent as kids grow up. Even as fully grown adults, women are looked upon negatively in numerous male-dominated positions. The same is for men who work in female-dominated jobs. In a partnership society, there is no dominant gender or sex; males and females work together in all positions. Feminine values like empathy, compassion and acceptance are freely expressed by both genders.

=== Emotional ===
Fear is significantly present in dominator model societies; more so from the group considered inferior. Abuse or violent activities can be seen at the domestic, work, and social levels. Individuals tend to intensely avoid showing emotions that could suggest vulnerability and weakness in front of others. In partnership model societies, trust is nurtured between people and sharing one's emotions is encouraged. Violence is avoided.

=== Value beliefs ===
At its core, dominator model societies thrive on a system of domination and control. Power is seen as good and violence is not an offensive method to attaining one's goal. For one group to get ahead, it's necessary for another to be put down. On the contrary, partnership model societies thrive on the compassion and mutual respect each individual has for one another. Problems are solved through negotiation as each party tries to come to a solution that's accommodating for all.

Over the last few millennia, dominator model societies have largely prevailed in human history but this does not mean that partnership model ideals have been completely eradicated. There have been times when the partnership model has resurfaced within society as well. Eisler ascertains that at several levels, these two models exist:

1. With those we have an intimate relationship with.
2. With one's own thoughts and conceptions.
3. With the local community.
4. Between citizens and the government.
5. With the global community.
6. Between human beings and nonhuman nature.
7. Between the individual and the divine.

== Partnership model in prehistoric civilization ==
The pattern of invasion and conquest repeats itself in several prehistoric partnership-oriented societies. The most common is of a dominator-oriented society taking over a partnership society and then transforming its culture to, including but not limited to, its religious values. They introduce their own religion, which often involve gods of war and aggression, and suppress the original society's religious beliefs. By diminishing the value of the goddesses and other feminine ideals in the myths and religions of partnership societies, it then spread to diminishing the value of feminine ideals in society.

Minoan civilization of Crete

The last known major civilization to have a partnership society, the Minoan civilization of Crete, flourished during the Bronze Age over 3500 years ago. Having existed even before Archaic Greece, it is one of the earliest known civilizations in Europe and is vital to recreating the timeline of Europe's history. First discovered by Sir Arthur Evans, numerous artifacts have since been uncovered documenting the way of life of this ancient civilization. The Minoans had constructed enormous courts at four different palace sites which are believed to be centers for trade and other large social, political and religious activities. The Minoans also built religious tombs and cemeteries, staircases and extensive store areas showing a highly sophisticated standard of living most impressive for their time. Most of what we know of their culture is from what was found in their myths, writings, pottery and frescoes. From these artifacts, historians have gathered that females played a large role in their society. A female figure known as “The Goddess” appears numerous times in both myths and pottery work, implying that they worshiped her in Minoan religion. The Goddess is a symbol also seen in artifacts of other prehistoric partnership societies (artifacts such as the Venus of Laussel). It is believed that the Goddess was a symbol of life and nature as every depiction of her involved explicit detail of her form and reproductive genitalia. In prehistoric times, many people relied upon farming for the majority of their food so having a good relationship with the earth was very important to the people of this time period. Thus, women were not only treated as equals in society (or even higher), but also worshipped in their religion as the main supreme deity. The male deity was either absent or was secondary because it is mentioned much less often. As a result, women could have a high status because of religious and social customs. This status could be comparable to the male or surpass the male.

Although weapon-like tools and armor were found among the artifacts, the lack of battle fortifications found on the Minoan research sites suggests that the civilization was peaceful as a whole. There is very little evidence to suggest that there were ever any major internal disputes within the Minoan civilization, however there are several factors that are said to have influenced its later downfall. One of the most supported is the theory that it was due to outside conquest. Spyridon Marinatos, a Greek archaeologist, theorized that around 1500 B.C.E. a nearby volcano had erupted on the island of Crete, weakening the civilization. It likely did not cause the demise of the civilization but it crippled both its population and its economy making the Minoans vulnerable. Taking advantage of this weakness, the Mycenaeans, a neighboring military civilization, invaded the Minoans. The Minoans were not an aggressive military power but their island isolation made them difficult to be subdued, so the destruction caused by the volcano's eruption was enough to allow the Mycenaeans to successfully invade.

The Mycenaeans soon populated the island of Crete, bringing with them their own cultures and traditions. Mycenaean weaponry also began to appear in Minoan burial tombs on Crete as the civilization becomes more militaristic. Just as in Minoan culture, females were still seen as important in religion, but new Gods were introduced as well. A few of these Gods include as Zeus, Poseidon, Hephaestus, Artemis and Dionysus, and can still be found in modern religions. The Goddess of the Minoans still remained present in certain areas, but she was not seen as important as she was to the former Minoan civilization.

During the 8th century, the Mycenaean civilization, along with several other civilizations on the Mediterranean, collapsed for unknown reasons. Many archaeologists speculate a catastrophic environmental disaster caused them to become vulnerable to outside military forces. After this dark age, Greek civilization developed rapidly once again but the Goddess had been completely replaced with the new Gods of the Mycenaean civilization. The male gods ruled over all creation in their myths with female gods playing only supporting roles.
