= UWA Telerobot =

A teleoperable robot

The UWA telerobot is a teleoperable robot belonging to the school of mechanical and civil engineering at The University of Western Australia.

== Development ==
The UWA telerobot is a historic landmark for the Internet and The University of Western Australia. It was the first telerobot device made available for general use on the Internet in 1994. The UWA telerobot was originally developed as part of a PhD thesis by Kenneth Taylor and was the subject of a later PhD by Barney Dalton.

The first robot on the Internet, a plastic toy robot with only 2 degrees of freedom, was placed online by a team under Ken Goldberg at the University of Southern California only three weeks before the UWA team released their website. The USC robot only lasted for seven months. The UWA robot is still online today, although the original robot was replaced in 1996 and the robot is no longer available for unrestricted public access, though interested parties can request permission.

== Implementation ==
The current UWA telerobot is an ABB IRB1400 model 6 DOF serial chain robot fitted with a pneumatic gripper attachment. The robot runs on a standard ABB S4 Robot Controller linked to a Linux server and which in turn communicates with a second server running ABB's RobComm software and a National Instruments Labview application that was custom written for the task by James Trevelyan with assistance from Perth-based Icon Technologies and students. The robot forms part of the UWA telelabs project.

The Telerobot has undergone many changes to its control structure over time. Originally controlled via static HTML web pages using CGI, work by Dalton saw the introduction of an augmented reality Java-based interface that met with limited success. Control is currently by way of a downloadable LabVIEW client application that incorporates real-time video streaming, with access control provided by the Telelabs system.

== Current status ==
The robot continues to be the basis for research and group projects undertaken by Mechatronics Engineering students and staff at UWA, Primarily involving the addition of new features or capabilities to the system. The robot is also used as a teaching aid for a course in mechanisms and multibody systems run by Karol Miller.
