= David Elliot Loye =

American psychologist (1925–2022)

- Born: April 26, 1925 Palo Alto, California, U.S.
- Died: January 25, 2022 (aged 96) Carmel, California, U.S.
- Notable awards: 1972 Anisfield-Wolfe Award; 1993 Moral Pioneering Award
- Spouses: Billy Henslee Loye, Riane Eisler
- Children: Four

Website
- www.davidloye.com

David Elliot Loye (April 26, 1925 – January 25, 2022) was an American author, psychologist, and evolutionary systems scientist.

== Early life ==
Born in Palo Alto, California, Loye served in World War II in the Navy under the writer Walter Karig. Their division was involved in writing projects associated with the war effort. After the war, he completed his undergraduate education at Dartmouth College in writing and psychology. There, his poetry classes with Robert Frost deeply influenced him. He returned to Oklahoma City and worked with journalist Frank McGee at WKYTV.

== Career ==
Loye went on to become the editor of Oklahoma Today magazine before moving to Princeton New Jersey in 1960. While there he began attending the New School and ultimately earned a master's degree and a doctorate in psychology. Loye wrote the national award-winning (Anisfield-Wolfe Award, 1972) book, The Healing of a Nation. This book focused on history and solutions to healing the "sickness" of racism in America.

During this time Loye moved to a job with the Educational Testing Services in Princeton, New Jersey. After his Phd was awarded he began a short-term position at Princeton University (1970-1971), Before moving to Los Angeles to become a UCLA School of Medicine Research Director for the Program on Psychosocial Adaptation and Neuropsychiatric Institute (1971–78). Along with Roderic Gorney and Gary Steele, Loye developed the groundwork for the study on television violence its impact of mass entertainment on evolution and human survival.

In the 1980s Loye moved to Carmel, California and transitioned to full-time writing and research on the evolution within society in a social context. He worked with his partner and wife, Riane Eisler, along with evolution theorist Ervin Laszlo on concepts of a cooperatively oriented theory of evolution. These three, along with others, became co-founders of the multinational General Evolution Research Group and World Futures: The Journal of General Evolution, of which Loye is a former book review editor and continuing member of the editorial board.

=== Charles Darwin ===
In the 1990s Loye wrote about Charles Darwin’s case for moral evolution rather than the "survival of the fittest/selfish gene theory" mindset as a higher order prime driver for human evolution. Of his book Darwin’s Lost Theory, internationally eminent scientist Ervin Laszlo has written: "...everyone concerned with our understanding of evolution on this planet owes Loye a deep debt of gratitude... Of urgent importance to the intellectual discourse of our time...[he] has brought his unique erudition to an enormous and critical task, and carried it off with genius...Should cause a revolution in social theory...Dramatically changes our understanding of Darwin and of evolution itself...One of the major books of the early Twenty-First Century".

== Personal life and death ==
Loye married twice, first to Billy Henslee Loye, and secondly to author Riane Eisler. He had four children. Loye died in Carmel, California on January 25, 2022, at the age of 96.

== Honors ==
- Anisfield-Wolfe Book Award for best scholarly book on race relations, 1971
- The Moral Pioneering Award of the Society for Chaos Theory in Psychology and the Life Sciences, presentation by Fred Abraham, President, 1993.
- Award for Dedication "to the knowledge of what matters most to future life" by the Foundation for Ethics and Meaning, presentation by Bruce Novak, President, 2000.
- Honorary Doctorate by the pioneering institution for humanistic psychology and systems science, the Saybrook Graduate School and Research Center, presentation by Lorne Buchman, President, 2008.

== Books ==
- 1971. The Healing of a Nation. New York: Norton. ISBN 978-0393086287
- 1977. The Leadership Passion: A Psychology of Ideology. San Francisco, CA.: Jossey-Bass. ISBN 978-0875893020 (IUniverse reprint: ISBN 096655146X)
- 1978. The Knowable Future: A Psychology of Forecasting and Prophecy. New York: Wiley-Interscience. ISBN 9780471035664
- 1983. The Sphinx and the Rainbow: Brain, Mind and Future Vision. Boston: Shambhala New Science Library. ISBN 039472187X (IUniverse reprint ISBN 0966551478)
- (Ed.) 1998. The Evolutionary Outrider: The Impact of the Human Agent on Evolution. Twickenham, England: Adamantine Press; Westport, CT: Praeger.
- 1990. Eisler, Riane and D. Loye. The Partnership Way: New tools for living and learning, healing our families, our world (a practical companion for The Chalice and the Blade). San Francisco. Harper. 242pp. ISBN 0062502905
- 2000. An Arrow Through Chaos: How We See Into the Future. Rochester, VT.: Park Street Press. ISBN 0892818492
- (Ed.) 2004. The Great Adventure: toward fully human theory of evolution. Albany, SUNY Press. ISBN 0791459233
- 2007. Bankrolling Evolution: A Program for a President. Carmel, CA.: Benjamin Franklin Press. ISBN 0978982703
- 2007. Measuring Evolution: A Leadership Guide to the Health and Wealth of Nations. Carmel, CA.: Benjamin Franklin Press. ISBN 0978982711
- 2007. Darwin’s Lost Theory: Who We Really Are and Where We’re Going. Carmel, CA.: Benjamin Franklin Press. ISBN 0978982762
- 2007. Darwin on Love. Carmel, CA.: Benjamin Franklin Press.
- 2007. The River and the Star: the lost story of the great explorers of the better world. Benjamin Franklin Press, 456 pp. ISBN 0978982789
- 2010. Darwin's Lost Theory: Bridge to a Better World. [updated third edition]. Carmel, CA: Benjamin Franklin Press. ISBN 0595001319
- 2010 Darwin’s Second Revolution. Carmel CA, Benjamin Franklin Press. 242pp. ISBN 0979525756

== See also ==
- Riane Eisler
- Futures studies
- The Chalice and the Blade
- Arabella Buckley
