= Androcracy =

Ruling by males

Androcracy is a form of government in which the government rulers are male. The males have the central roles of political leadership, moral authority, and control of property. Other terms sometimes used include phallocracy, andrarchy, or androcentric or phallocratic society.

== Example ==
Traditionally, influential political positions have been disproportionately occupied by males. With the rise of feminism since the late 19th century, opinions concerning women in politics have changed in a manner that has facilitated an increase in female political participation. Nevertheless, there continues to be a considerable disparity between the percentage of males and females in politics. As of 2011 women represented 19.4 percent of all parliamentarians in the regions of Europe, the Americas, Sub-Saharan Africa, Asia, the Pacific, the Arab States, and Nordic countries, with the level of female participation in parliament varying between regions, ranging from percentages as high as 42 in Nordic countries to as low as 11.4 in Arabic states.

Riane Eisler, in her book The Chalice and the Blade, contrasts androcratic male-dominated society with gylany, i.e., partnership society based on gender equality. Gylany is balanced and equalitarian, and should not be confused with gynocracy or matriarchy, which define the ancient systems where women ruled without hierarchy and lineage was matricentral.

== Gender bias ==
Androcracy as a gender bias may influence the decision-making process in many countries. Kleinberg and Boris point to a dominant paradigm which promotes wage-earning fathers with financially dependent mothers, the exclusion of same-sex couples, and the marginalization of single-parent families.

== Gynocracy ==
The opposite of androcracy is gynocracy, or rule by women. It is related to but not synonymous with matriarchy. Evidence indicating historical gynocracies survives mostly in mythology and in some archaeological records, although it is disputed by some authors, like Cynthia Eller in her book The Myth of Matriarchal Prehistory.

== See also ==
- Male chauvinism
- Matriarchy
- Patriarchy
