= Gynecocracy =

Term for the rule of women over men

Gynocracy is a term that refers to the rule of women over men. Also known as gynocracy, gynaecocracy, gyneocracy, and gynarchy. It has been in use since the 17th century, building on the Greek word γυναικοκρατία found in Aristotle and Plutarch. Unlike matriarchy, gynarchy is defined as women's rule rather than mothers.' It can be contrasted with Androcracy meaning rule by men.

== History ==
In the 1700s, Joseph-François Lafitau used the ancient Greek term to describe the organization of the Haudenosaunee Confederacy. Following his footsteps scholars Johann Jakob Bachofen and Lewis Morgan used the term to refer to rule by women. Morgan again used the term to refer to the Haudenosaunee but Bachofen used it as part of his evolutionary model of history.

== Terminology ==
Although the terms are synonyms, there are minute differences between them. Gynecocracy means 'women's social supremacy', gynaecocracy means 'government by one woman', 'female dominance', and, derogatorily, 'petticoat government', and gynocracy means 'women as the ruling class'. Gyneocracy is rarely used in modern times. In pornography and BDSM the term gynarchy is sometimes fetishized used for femdom and female-led relationship.
