= Character Day =

Global film event

Character Day is a global event for people to screen films on the topic of science as it relates to character development. Participants review printed materials and resources for discussions linked globally online about their own character, who they are, who they would like to be, and how to develop these character strengths, based on evidence-based research. Character Day, on September 22, 2016, is in its third year. Character Day for 2017 is September 13, 2017. In 2018 it was set for September 26, 2018. September 27–28, 2019 is scheduled.

== History ==
Character Day was created in 2014 by Tiffany Shlain, the co-founder of the non-profit Let it Ripple: Mobile Films for Global Change, founder of the Webby Awards, and the co-founder of the International Academy of Digital Arts and Sciences, to launch a global premier of the short film The Science of Character, which explores the social science and neuroscience behind character development. Shlain and Let it Ripple produced Character Day, and invited schools and organizations around the world to premier the film and discuss its ideas about character development all on the same day via a simultaneous online video conversation. There were over 1500 events in 31 country on March 14, 2014. The State Department's Bureau of Educational and Cultural Affairs also selected The Science of Character to be part of their American Film Program.

On September 8, 2015, Character Day became an annual event. For the second event, Shlain and Let it Ripple premiered Shlain's film The Adaptable Mind, which explores skills needed in the 21st Century, and The Making of a Mensch, about the science of character through the Jewish teachings of Mussar interpreted through a modern-day lens. The second Character Day had over 6700 events in 41 countries. In addition, the US State Department selected The Adaptable Mind to be part of their 2016-2017 American Film Showcase.

Character Day 2016 is September 22, and currently has over 13,000 events.

== Events ==
In 2014, over 1500 schools and organizations watched The Science of Character including people 31 countries, with people joining the conversation online from over 120 countries. Experts in character education from Harvard, Yale, University of California Berkeley, and others led a virtual global Q&A. The US State Department had screenings in Washington DC and embassies around the world including Egypt and Vietnam, among others. Volunteers translated the film into 14 languages including Arabic, Bulgarian, Chinese, French, German, Hindi, Japanese, Norwegian, Persian, Romanian, Russian, Serbian, Spanish and Swahili.

In 2015, Character Day screened the film The Adaptable Mind for 6,784 schools, classrooms, workplaces and organizations. Events took place in 41 countries on all inhabited continents except Antarctica. People from 125 countries participated in the online discussion.
