= Kimberly Brooks (artist) =

American painter

- Born: Kimberly Shlain; New York City, New York, U.S.
- Education: University of California, Berkeley; Otis College of Art and Design; UCLA
- Style: Contemporary, abstract, realist
- Spouse: Albert Brooks (m. 1997)
- Children: 2
- Father: Leonard Shlain
- Relatives: Tiffany Shlain (sister); Jordan Shlain (brother)
- Website: www.kimberlybrooks.com

Kimberly Brooks (née Shlain) is an American artist and author. Her work blends figuration and abstraction with a focus on subjects related to memory, reality, history, representation, and identity.

== Early life and education ==
Born in New York City as Kimberly Shlain, she is the daughter of Leonard Shlain and Carol (nee) Lewis. She grew up in Mill Valley, California. There she studied sculpture, drawing, and painting as a child. She attended UC Berkeley and earned a Bachelor of Arts degree in literature. Following her graduation, she spent a year in Paris and attended the Sorbonne. She later studied painting at UCLA and Otis College of Art and Design.

== Work ==
=== Painting and multimedia ===
Brooks' first solo exhibition, The Whole Story, was held at the Risk Press Gallery in Los Angeles in 2006. It featured a series of segmented paintings which investigated the role of women as artists and models. Brooks used erotic imagery and fragmentation to examine the historical glorification of women's bodies to present the female image within a feminist representation.

Brooks' second solo show, Mom's Friends, explored feminism of the early 1960s and 1970s. The paintings were based on her mother and her friends in Marin County, California. In addition to original photographs, Brooks shot recreations, using friends and models in vintage clothing.

In 2008, Brooks' exhibited Technicolor Summer. She began work on Technicolor Summer after her father was diagnosed with a terminal illness, and wrote on the subject "every moment was more vivid because it could be the last one. It was a summer in high definition. A summer in technicolor." These paintings aimed to convey qualities of old photographs.

After attending a talk at LACMA about Elsa Schiaparelli's and Coco Chanel's influence on the paintings of Henri Matisse, Brooks began a project creating portraits of well-known costume and fashion designers, and stylists, titled The Style Project. This looked at ideas of personal style and trends in popular fashion, using photos of her subjects in their own environments as reference to the paintings. Themes around female beauty and fashion continue with Thread in 2011, and in 2014, she had two solo shows; I See People Disappear and I Have A King Who Does Not Speak.

In 2015, Brooks' 8-foot-tall uncoated steel pendant, "The Ephemerality of Manner," was permanently acquired by the Cooper Building in Los Angeles' Fashion District. Using video, collage work, textile pieces, and welded steel, it was created as part of her site-specific installation "Thread and Bone." The Los Angeles Times wrote that the sculpture was "shot through with subtle complexities and contradictions traversing fashion, feminism, architecture and art history."

In September 2017, the Zevitas Marcus Gallery in Los Angeles presented Brazen, a solo exhibition of paintings Brooks began working on after the 2016 American presidential election. Brooks used silver and gold leaf to create paintings that incorporate religious icons, grand interiors and ornamentation.

=== Teaching, writing, speaking ===
Between 2007 and 2009, Brooks interviewed artists and contributed more than 70 essays about art for First Person Artist, her weekly column in The Huffington Post. She founded the Huffington Post Arts section in 2010 and its Science section in 2011. In 2011, she presented "The Creative Process in Eight Stages" at a TEDx conference.

== Personal life ==
Brooks lives in Los Angeles, and works out of a studio in Venice, California. She and her husband, Albert Brooks married in 1997. Together they have two children. Following her father's death, Brooks and her siblings, Tiffany Shlain and Jordan Shlain, worked together to edit the manuscript of his final book, Leonardo's Brain: Understanding Da Vinci's Creative Genius.

== Solo exhibitions, publications and installations ==
- 2018 Brazen: A Painting and Poetry Collection, Edited by Keith Martin. Poets Brandon Constantine, Richard Ferguson, Luivette Resto and Marie Marandola contribute poems inspired by paintings of Kimberly Brooks. Published by Griffith Moon.
- 2018 Mid Career Survey, Mt San Antonio College, Walnut, CA
- 2015 Thread and Bone, the Cooper Building, Los Angeles, California
- 2014 I Have A King Who Does Not Speak Roosevelt Library, San Antonio, Texas
