= Myth of redemptive violence =

The Myth of Redemptive Violence is an archetypal plot in literature, especially in imperial cultures. One of the oldest versions of this story is the creation myth of Babylon (the Enûma Elish) from around 1250 B.C. Walter Wink coined the term as part of an analysis of its impact on modern culture and its role in maintaining oppressive power structures in his book The Powers That Be.

== See also ==
- Joseph Campbell
- Carl Jung
- Richard Dawkins
- René Girard
- Liberation Theology
- Dominator culture
- Tale of Two Brothers
