= Bata (god) =

Egyptian deity

Name in hieroglyphs
bA Z1 t X2 N17 Z1 Z1 Z1 G7
- Major cult center: Saka
- Symbol: Bull

Genealogy
- Siblings: Anubis

Bata from Saka is an Egyptian bull-god of the New Kingdom, who represents together with his brother Anubis the 17th Upper Egyptian Nome.

== History ==
Until the middle of the Eighteenth Dynasty Bata was represented as a ram and later as a bull. Bata is probably identical with the death god Bt of the Egyptian Old Kingdom, known from the Saqqara necropolis, for instance from the Mastaba of Ti. Bata is not mentioned in the Pyramid Texts and Coffin Texts.

== In literature ==
Bata is the name of the protagonist in the Tale of Two Brothers, a copy of which survives on the New Kingdom Papyrus D’Orbiney, where he is the brother of Anubis. He is also mentioned in the Ptolemaic Papyrus Jumilhac.

== See also ==
- List of Egyptian deities
- Cattle in religion and mythology
- Tale of Two Brothers

== Bibliography ==
- Susan T. Hollis: On the Nature of Bata, the Hero of the Papyrus d'Orbiney, in: Chronique d'Égypte 59, 1984, 248-257
