= 50/50 (2016 film) =

2016 documentary film

- Directed by: Tiffany Shlain
- Written by
- Cinematography: Shane King
- Production company: Let It Ripple
- Release date: 28 October 2016 (United States)
- Language: English

50/50 is a 2016 documentary film by Tiffany Shlain on "the 10,000 year history of women and power" The film addresses the lack of equal representation in politics. The film premiered on #TEDWomen and at TEDx.

Over 10,000 screenings of were scheduled for 10 May 2017, which was termed "50/50 Day."
