= Jordan Shlain =

American physician

- Born: Jordan Lewis Shlain; San Francisco, California
- Education: University of California, Berkeley; Georgetown University
- Occupations: Physician, entrepreneur
- Board member of: Private Physicians Alliance (chairman); Equinox; NYU Tisch Center Hospitality in Healthcare Advisory Board
- Spouse: Caroline Eggli Shlain
- Children: 4
- Father: Leonard Shlain
- Website: privatemedical.org

Jordan Shlain is an American physician, writer, and health tech entrepreneur. An originator of concierge medicine, he is the founder and chairman of Private Medical Group, a family office for health and medicine, and Eat Real, a non-profit organization focused on improving nutrition standards for the public school system. He served as commissioner of the San Francisco Health Services Board from 2010-2014.

Shlain was introduced to computers as a child and learned to code in high school. He founded SeniorWell, a telemedicine service, as a medical school resident. In 2008, he founded HealthLoop, an AI platform that used patient feedback to track progress and monitor clinical areas of concern. He was awarded one of the first patents for digital healthcare technology in 2013.

== Early life and education ==
Shlain was born in San Francisco to Carole Lewis, a psychologist, and Leonard Shlain, an author and surgeon. He learned to code at a computer camp and wrote software as a teenager.

Shlain graduated from UC Berkeley in 1989 with a degree in anatomy and physiology. Before attending medical school, he spent a year teaching high school chemistry, physics, and biology in rural Kenya as a participant in the Harvard University Center for International Development WorldTeach program. He graduated from Georgetown Medical School in 1994. In 1997 he completed a residency in internal medicine at California Pacific Medical Center/UC San Francisco.

== Career ==
=== SeniorWell, On Call San Francisco, MedicinePlanet, Private Medical ===
Shlain made house calls to geriatric patients during his residency, and in 1996 founded a telemedicine service, SeniorWell, to help doctors communicate with older adults.

In 1998, he learned that the Mandarin Oriental in downtown San Francisco had no house doctor for guests needing medical attention. He successfully pitched his services and became the on-call doctor for the hotel, where he was trained in hospitality practices by the concierge. In 1999, based on his experience at the Mandarin Oriental, he founded San Francisco On Call Medical Group. At the same time, he was the California medical director for Lufthansa and a member of the board of directors for the San Francisco Medical Society.

Shlain co-founded MedicinePlanet, a website that provided global medical information for international travelers, in 2000. He served as MedicinePlanet's CEO until 2001, when he left to focus on San Francisco On Call, which had become Current Health to reflect its expansion beyond the Bay area. He founded Private Medical in 2002. As of 2024, Private Medical had more than 1000 member families, and offices in San Francisco, Silicon Valley, Santa Monica, Beverly Hills, New York, and Miami.

=== HealthLoop, San Francisco Health Systems Board ===
In 2008 Gavin Newsom, then the mayor of San Francisco, appointed Shlain to the Health Services Systems Board. As commissioner from 2010-2014, he developed policy and oversaw the allocation of healthcare funds for more than 45,000 city workers. It was his second governmental position: a 2004 appointee of Willie Brown, he set entertainment and nightlife policy for the city and county of San Francisco as president of the San Francisco Entertainment Commission.

In 2008, Shlain developed the prototype for HealthLoop, a SaaS platform for doctors that used patient feedback and tracking data to monitor clinical areas of concern and facilitate follow-up. Shlain served as CEO of the company. An early application of AI, he was awarded a patent for pre-visit and follow-up systems and digital technology in 2013. A study in the Journal of Arthroplasty found that the platform significantly improved patient outcomes and reduced healthcare costs. HealthLoop was acquired by GetWellNetwork in 2018.

=== Covid-19, public health, DOC, Eat Real ===
Shlain treated coronavirus patients as a frontline volunteer at clinics and facilities including NewYork-Presbyterian Hospital at the height of the COVID-19 pandemic in New York City. During the pandemic, he wrote about healthcare and health policy, served on expert panels, and sat for interviews with print and broadcast media outlets including USA Today, The Globe and Mail, and the BBC. In addition, he co-wrote an April 2020 op-ed for The New York Times that argued for smart quarantine, and published Dispatches from the Front, a series of articles about staying healthy during the pandemic.

In 2019, Shlain and Robert Lustig founded Eat Real, a non-profit that partners with school districts to replace ultraprocessed school lunches for K–12 students with nutrient rich and sustainably-sourced foods. In October 2025, with John Battelle, he launched DOC, an invitation-only conference centered on health, longevity, and science. A "medicine-focused reincarnation of the early days of TED", the inaugural two-day event took place in the Napa Valley,

== Personal life ==
Shlain's father, Leonard Shlain, died in 2009, shortly after completing his book, Leonardo's Brain: Understanding Da Vinci's Creative Genius. Shlain and his sisters, Kimberly Shlain Brooks and Tiffany Shlain, edited the 500-page manuscript, which was published by Rowman & Littlefield in 2014.

Shlain, who also plays in a band, acted in Massimiliano Finazzer Flory's play Being Leonardo DaVinci: An Impossible Interview at the American Conservatory Theater in 2015.
