= Telegarden =

Community garden art project tended remotely over the Internet 1995-2004

TeleGarden
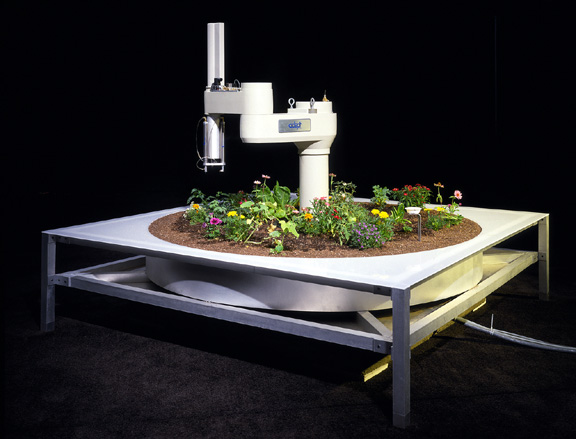
- Website type: Telerobotics
- Available in: English
- Creators: Ken Goldberg and Joseph Santarromana
- Commercial: No
- Registration: Optional
- Launched: June 1995; 31 years ago
- Current status: Offline

The TeleGarden was a telerobotic community garden for the Internet. Starting in the mid-1990s, it allowed users to view, plant and take care of a small garden, using an Adept-1 industrial robotic arm controlled online.

== History ==
The project began at the University of Southern California with project directors Ken Goldberg of University of Southern California, and Joseph Santarromana, a University of California, Irvine artist at the time known for his video installations. They envisioned it as an art installation challenging the notion of the Internet and "consider[ing] the 'post-nomadic' community, where survival favors those who work together."

Project members included George A. Bekey, Steven Gentner, Rosemary Morris, Carl Sutter, Jeff Wiegley, and Erich Berger. The Telegarden went online in June 1995. During its first year, it attracted over 9000 members. In September 1996, the Telegarden was moved to the Ars Electronica Center in Austria where it was originally planned to be on display for one year, though it ended up remaining active until August 2004.

The Telegarden was a fusion between old technology (agriculture) and new technology (the Internet). The notion of a physical garden that is operated by users online was appealing to Goldberg because "it was the most absurd".

This new media art raised questions of legitimacy. How are users to know that the garden actually exists, or that any of their motions matter? Goldberg stressed that, "media technology generally facilities the suspension of disbelief."

In its nine years, the installation had 10,000 members, and 100,000 people visited the physical exhibit. Users interactivity created a miniature social network. People became protective of plants, even territorial.
