= The Alphabet Versus the Goddess =

1998 book by Leonard Shlain

The Alphabet Versus the Goddess: The Conflict Between Word and Image
- Author: Leonard Shlain
- Language: English
- Subject: Anthropology
- Published: 1998
- Publication place: United States
- Media type: Print
- Pages: 464
- ISBN: 978-0-670-87883-3
- OCLC: 39093593
- LC Class: P211.7 .S57 1998

The Alphabet Versus the Goddess: The Conflict Between Word and Image is a work of historical anthropology by American surgeon Leonard Shlain, published by Viking Press in 1998.

== Content ==
The core claim of the book is that there is a conflict between left- and right-hemisphere thinking, and that the development of writing systems and literacy has led to left-hemisphere thinking becoming dominant in most societies. Shlain associates the left hemisphere with "linear, sequential, reductionist, and abstract" thought, and the right hemisphere with "feminine, visual, and holistic" thought. As a result, the development of writing systems crowds out feminine modes of thought in favor of masculine modes, resulting in the dominance of patriarchal social systems. The book applies this concept to 35 case studies, pairs of concepts and historical periods, such as Image vs. Word; Hunters vs. Gatherers; and Aleph vs. Bet.

== Criticism ==
Criticism has been leveled at the book for multiple reasons. One significant concern is that the scientific basis for Shlain's claims is weak. Sandra Blakeslee wrote in a review in The New York Times, “The human nervous system, he says, was substantially rewired when people began reading alphabets. Never mind that there is no scientific evidence for this claim." Blakeslee further argues that the connections Shlain builds are primarily correlations without evidence of causation, and that the lateralization of brain functions is "a matter of processing style rather than having specific mental traits reside on one side or the other,” as Shlain presents.

Shlain's work has also been criticized for factual errors in the examples on which he relies to illustrate his core hypothesis. John Algeo cites errors in a range of examples, such as Shlain's claim that Buddha's disciples were strictly male, despite contemporary writings reporting female disciples of the Buddha.

A third critical approach addresses the paradigm itself as overly simplistic. Dorothea McEwan objects to Shlain's attempt to reduce complex social changes to a singular cause (the rise of literacy), writing of Shlain's approach: "Reductionism [...] is never a healthy approach to doing history."

== See also ==
- Bicameral mentality
- Lateralization of brain function
- List of works in critical theory
- The Origin of Consciousness in the Breakdown of the Bicameral Mind
- Phallogocentrism
- Writing system
