= Tiffany Shlain =

American filmmaker and author (1970)

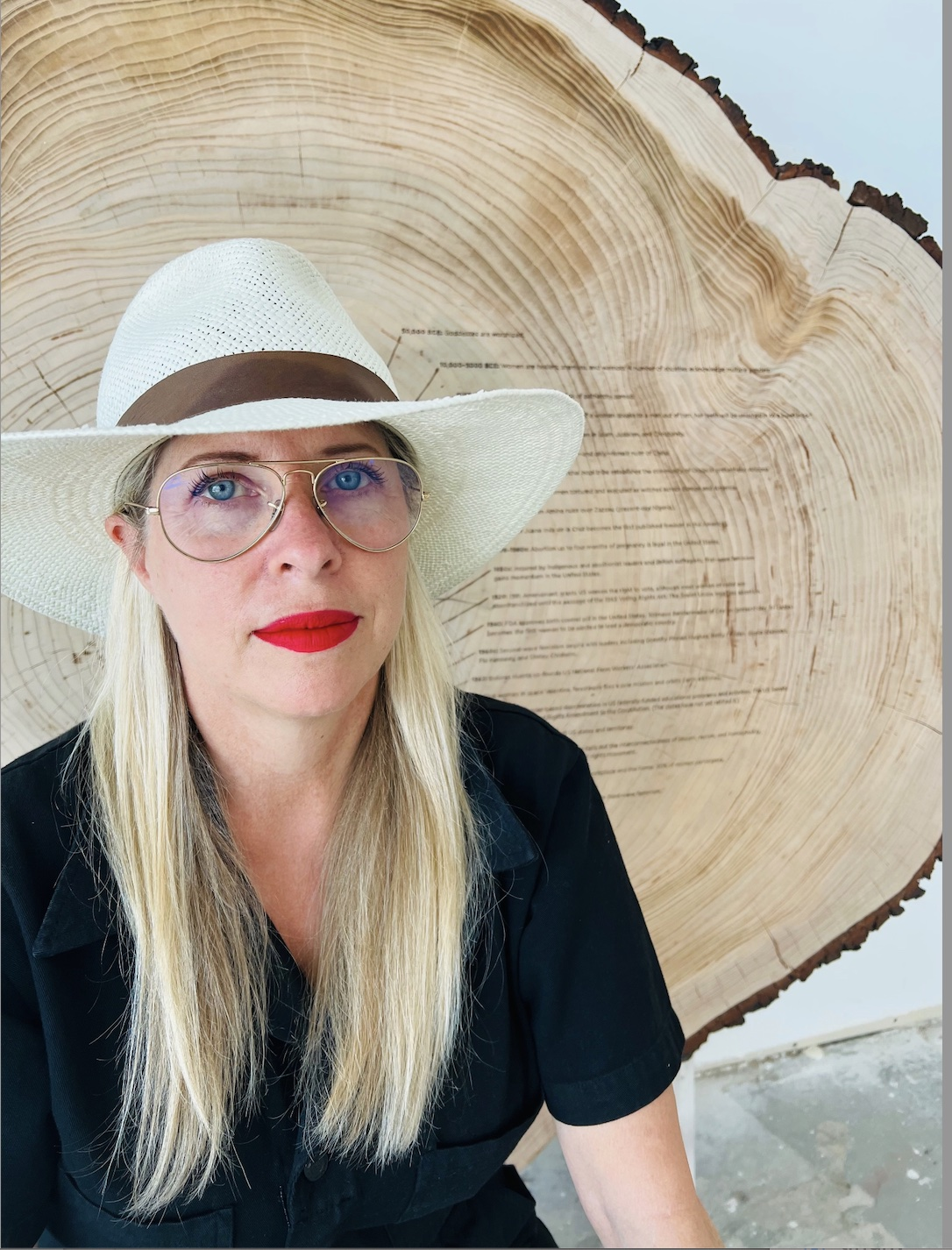
- Tiffany Shlain, 2022
- Born: April 8, 1970 (age 56); US
- Education: University of California, Berkeley
- Occupations: Filmmaker, author
- Spouse: Ken Goldberg
- Children: 2
- Father: Leonard Shlain
- Website: tiffanyshlain.com

Tiffany Shlain (born April 8, 1970) is an American filmmaker, artist, and author. Described by the public radio program On Being as "an internet pioneer", Shlain is the co-founder of the Webby Awards and the founder of the International Academy of Digital Arts and Sciences.

== Early life and education ==
Tiffany Shlain was born on April 8, 1970 to surgeon, inventor and writer Leonard Shlain, and Carole Lewis Jaffe.

In high school, Shlain co-wrote a proposal called Uniting Nations in Telecommunications & Software (UNITAS), which envisioned students all over the world communicating over personal computers and via modems before the advent of the web. From this proposal, she was invited to be a student ambassador through the People to People program, and traveled to the Soviet Union in 1988.

While a student at UC Berkeley, Shlain produced and directed Hunter & Pandora, an experimental film which won the university's Eisner Award, the highest award in art. In 1992, she earned a BA in Interdisciplinary Studies, and was selected as a valedictory speaker for her graduating class.

Shlain studied organizational change at the Harvard Business School Executive Education program and film production at New York University's Sight & Sound program. She is a Henry Crown Fellow of the Aspen Institute (Class of 2007).

== Career ==
In 1996, Shlain co-founded the Webby Awards, an annual event which the New York Times described as the "Oscars of the Web." In 1998, she founded The International Academy of Digital Arts & Sciences. The Webbys had hosts that included Alan Cumming, and appearances by Al Gore, Prince, and Thomas Friedman. Shlain appeared on Good Morning America as the program's on-air internet expert from 2000 – 2003.

In 2002, Shlain directed, produced and co-wrote Life, Liberty, and the Pursuit of Happiness, a documentary about reproductive rights in America. The film premiered at the 2003 Sundance Film Festival and was used nationally by Planned Parenthood to mark the 30-year anniversary of Roe v. Wade.

In 2005, Shlain sold the Webby Awards and founded the San Francisco film studio, the Moxie Institute. Shlain's next documentary, The Tribe, co-written with her husband, Ken Goldberg, explored American Jewish identity through the history of the Barbie doll. The Tribe, which also premiered at the Sundance Film Festival, won 18 awards and was the first documentary short to become #1 on iTunes.

In 2011, her first feature documentary, Connected: An Autoblogography About Love, Death & Technology, premiered at the Sundance Film Festival. The film ran in theaters and on television, and was subsequently released on digital platforms. It won 17 awards, including the Tribeca Film Festival's Disruptive Innovation Award.

In 2011, she introduced the concept of "Cloud Filmmaking" with a series of shorts produced through cloud-based collaborative filmmaking. The first film in the series, A Declaration of Interdependence, was released Sept 2011; the second film, Engage, debuted in early 2012. Later that year, both a 10-minute film and a TED Book, called Brain Power: From Neurons to Networks were released. Brain Power premiered in November 2012 at The California Academy of Sciences. It was selected by the US State Department as a part of the 2013 American Film Showcase and was screened at embassies in the Middle East in November 2013. Shlain discussed cloud filmmaking as the keynote speaker at the Tribeca Film Festival's 2013 Interactive Day where she delivered her "Cloud Filmmaking Manifesto."

In 2013, Shlain co-founded the nonprofit Let it Ripple: Mobile Films for Global Change, and continued making cloud films. The next film in the series was The Science of Character. To premiere the film, Shlain and her co-workers founded Character Day, where schools and organizations around the world would premiere the film and discuss ideas around character development on the same day in a simultaneous online video conversation. For the second annual Character Day, they premiered The Adaptable Mind, which explores skills needed in the 21st century, and The Making of a Mensch, about the science of character through the Jewish Teachings of Mussar, interpreted through a modern-day lens. In 2019, the sixth and final Character Day included over 200,000 groups in 125 countries and all 50 states, drawing over 4 million participants.

Shlain created two seasons of the AOL series The Future Starts Here, which includes episodes entitled Technology Shabbats, Motherhood Remix, 10 Stages of The Creative Process, The Future of Our Species, Why We Love Robots, co-directed with her husband Ken Goldberg, and A Case for Optimism. The series, which began airing on AOL in 2013 was nominated for an Emmy Award in the News & Documentary for New Approaches: Arts, Lifestyle & Culture in 2014, and has since been viewed more than 40 million times.

Shlain "is often asked to comment about Web culture on television and lectures to groups in the U.S. and internationally", according to the Los Angeles Times, and has spoken at TEDWomen and TEDMED. She delivered the keynote address for UC Berkeley's commencement ceremony in May 2010; the speech was included on NPR's list of "The Best Commencement Speeches, Ever."

Shlain directed a film on women and power that was released through Refinery29's "Shatterbox Anthology". Released on October 27, 2016, it is called 50/50: Rethinking the Past, Present, and Future of Women + Power, and explores the 10,000-year history of women. In addition, on May 10, 2017, in support of 50/50 Day: Gender Equality, 11,000 events took place around the world, all linked by the internet. These gatherings of people screened the film, listened to noteworthy activists and celebrities.

In 2017, Shlain was chosen to contribute one of 100 essays about the future, included in the world’s first 3D printed book, Genius: 100 Visions of the Future, which was printed in the International Space Station in zero gravity and debuted at the “Genius 100: Innovation Summit” event, attended by the participants.

In 2019, Shlain's book, 24/6: Giving Up Screens One Day a Week to Get More Time, Creativity, and Connection was published by Simon & Schuster. In 2020, the book was awarded the Marshall McLuhan Award for Outstanding Book in the Field of Media Ecology. In 2020, Shlain performed her spoken cinema show “Dear Human” at the Museum of Modern Art.

In 2022, she exhibited her solo art show Human Nature, including her feminist history dendrochronology (tree ring) piece, Dendrofemonology at the San Francisco Ferry Building. The National Women's History Museum (NWHM) repeated the show in January 2023. The exhibition was presented by the NWHM at the National Mall in November of 2023. In the following year, Shlain, in collaboration with Ken Goldberg, continued her dendrochronology art pieces with Ancient Wisdom for a Future Ecology: Trees, Time and Technology, a 2024 exhibition that was shown at the Skirball Cultural Center in Los Angeles as part of the Pacific Standard Time ART Initiative: Art & Science Collide of the J. Paul Getty Museum. The 2024 exhibition later debuted in San Francisco at the Di Rosa Center for Contemporary Art in 2026.

== Personal life ==
Shlain lives in Marin County, Northern California, with husband, artist and Professor of Robotics at U.C. Berkeley, Ken Goldberg, with whom she frequently collaborates on art installations and other projects. They have two daughters.

Shlain has a brother, Dr. Jordan Shlain; a sister, artist Kimberly Brooks; and brother-in-law, Albert Brooks. Her sister-in-law is Adele Goldberg. Following her father's death, Shlain and her siblings worked together to edit the manuscript of his final book, Leonardo's Brain: Understanding Da Vinci's Creative Genius.[2][3][15]

== Filmography ==
Year	Title	Credit
2025	We Are Here	Director
2024	The Teen Brain	Director
2021	Pause	Producer, host
2021	Dear Student	Director
2020	Dear Voter	Director
2019	Dear Parent	Director
2018	Unstoppable	Director
2018	Why I Pledge 5050	Director, co-writer, editor
2017	30,000 Days	Director, co-writer, editor
2016	50/50: Rethinking the Past, Present, and Future of Women + Power	Director, co-writer, editor
2015	The Adaptable Mind	Director, co-writer, editor
2015	The Making of a Mensch	Director, co-writer, editor
2014	The Future of Our Species	Director, co-writer
2014	Creative Bondage	Director, co-writer
2014	Parentechnology	Director, co-writer
2014	Transboom	Director, co-writer
2014	The Photosynthesis of Social Media	Director, co-writer
2014	Robots, Botox & Google Glass	Director, co-writer
2014	Punk Rock Diplomacy	Director, co-writer
2014	A Case for Dreaming	Director, co-writer
2014	The Science of Character	Director, co-writer
2013	Technology Shabbats	Director, co-writer
2013	Motherhood Remixed	Director, co-writer
2013	Tech Etiquette	Director, co-writer
2013	Why We Love Robots	Director, co-writer
2013	Participatory Revolution	Director, co-writer
2013	The Creative Process in 10 Acts	Director, co-writer
2013	Idea Porn	Director, co-writer
2013	A Case for Optimism	Director, co-writer
2013	The Future Starts Here' (series)	Director, co-writer
2013	Facing the Future	Director, co-writer
2012	Brain Power: From Neurons to Networks	Director, co-writer
2012	Engage	Director, co-writer
2011	Connected: An Autoblogography About Love, Death & Technology	Director, producer, co-writer
2011	Yelp: With Apologies to Allen Ginsberg's "Howl"	Director, co-writer
2011	A Declaration of Interdependence	Director, co-writer
2006	The Tribe	Director, producer, co-writer
2003	Life, Liberty and the Pursuit of Happiness	Director, co-writer
1992	Hunter & Pandora	Director, Writer
