= Dominion (political theory) =

Political concept of domination

In political theory, dominion (Latin: dominium) is the exercise of authority, possession, and/or domination.

== Etymology ==
The term comes from Latin dominium, meaning "property, ownership", itself derived from dominus, "lord, master".

== In John Wyclif's thought ==
The term is particularly associated with the thought of John Wyclif, whose works De dominio divino libri tres ("three books on divine dominion") and Tractatus de civili dominio ("a discourse on civil domination") developed his concepts of divine dominion (Latin: dominium divinum) and civil dominion (Latin: dominium civilis).

Wyclif argued that divine dominion determined the fundamentals of the existence of any created thing: all other kinds of just power derived from divine dominion. In Wyclif's thought, humans were granted dominion by the grace of the Christian God, and when they acted in love according to this relied-upon grace they instantiate the divine dominion in the world. Prior to the Fall of Man, this dominion was absolute and he called it natural dominion. After the Fall, humans accessed only a more limited form of dominion, constrained by human sinfulness, such as individual humans' selfish desire to exercise exclusive ownership of property.

Civil dominion was the dominion exercised by fallen humans over other humans or property, which they did not own but were lent by God. The church cannot have just ownership of any property, as this is forbidden by the gospel; therefore kings must exercise stewardship and relieve the church of its vast property (and distribute this among the people according to the dictates of charity), leaving clerics and religious to live in evangelical simplicity with communal ownership. Similarly, the church authorities must not take up legal roles.

Wyclif's ideas were influential on Jan Hus and Hussite thought. Wyclif's ideas about dominion have been explored in detail by Stephen E. Lahey.
