= Ken Goldberg =

American computer scientist (born 1961)

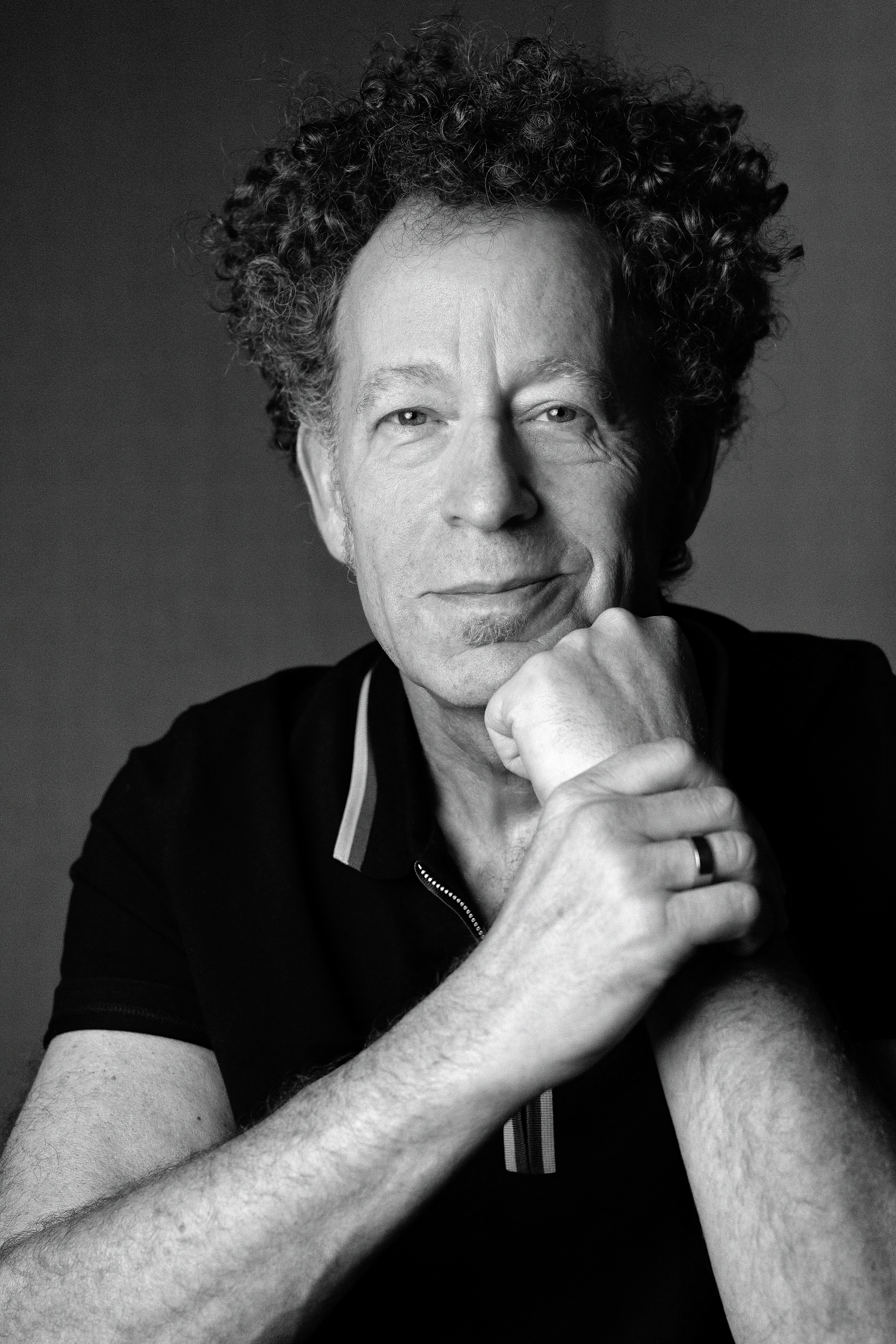
- Goldberg in 2026
- Born: Kenneth Yigael Goldberg; 1961 (age 64–65); Ibadan, Nigeria
- Education: University of Pennsylvania; Carnegie Mellon University
- Known for: Robotics
- Spouse: Tiffany Shlain
- Relatives: Adele Goldberg (sister)
- Scientific career
- Workplaces: University of Southern California; MIT; UC Berkeley
- Website: goldberg.berkeley.edu

Kenneth Yigael Goldberg (born 1961) is an American artist, writer, inventor, and researcher in the field of robotics and automation. He is professor and chair of the industrial engineering and operations research department at the University of California, Berkeley, and holds the William S. Floyd Jr. Distinguished Chair in Engineering at Berkeley, with joint appointments in Electrical Engineering and Computer Sciences (EECS), Art Practice, and the School of Information. Goldberg also holds an appointment in the Department of Radiation Oncology at the University of California, San Francisco.

== Background ==
Goldberg was born in Ibadan, Nigeria, where his parents taught at Mayflower Private School, and grew up in Bethlehem, Pennsylvania. Goldberg's father worked as an engineer, and Ken would work on projects with his father. Goldberg expressed an interest in art during high school, but his parents suggested he study something more practical. He received a BS in electrical engineering and BS in economics, summa cum laude, from the University of Pennsylvania in 1984. Goldberg also received his Ph.D. in computer science from Carnegie Mellon University in 1990. While studying abroad in Edinburgh, Goldberg took a course on artificial intelligence that began his interest in robotics and their artistic potential. He then taught in the department of computer science at the University of Southern California from 1991 to 1995 and was visiting faculty in 2000 at MIT.

== Career ==
=== Robotics ===
Goldberg and his students have published over 170 peer-reviewed technical papers on algorithms for Robotics, Automation, and social information filtering. Goldberg leads the UC Berkeley Automation Sciences Lab, which pursues research in Cloud Robotics and Automation, Social Information Retrieval using geometric algorithms, and Algorithmic Automation for Feeding, Fixturing, Grasping, with an emphasis on geometric algorithms that minimize sensing and actuation.

In his PhD dissertation, Goldberg developed the first algorithm for orienting (feeding) polygonal parts and proved that the algorithm can be used to orient any part up to rotational symmetry. He also patented the kinematically yielding gripper, a new robot gripper that complies passively to hold parts securely without sensing. Goldberg is co-founder and editor-in-chief of the IEEE Transactions on Automation Science and Engineering. His research has resulted in eight United States patents.

Goldberg is credited with developing the first robot with web interface (August 1994). His subsequent project, the Telegarden, allowed remote visitors, via the Internet, to view, water, and plant seeds in a living garden. This project was online continuously for nine years in the lobby of the Ars Electronica Center. Goldberg is a leading researcher in networked telerobotics and Cloud Robotics and has developed a series of collaborative tele-operation systems such as the Tele-Actor, in which a human moves through a remote environment guided by remote participants via the Internet.

Goldberg is co-founder, with Ayorkor Korseh, of the African Robotics Network (AFRON), established in 2012 to promote communication and collaborations that will enhance robotics-related education, research, and industry on the continent of Africa. AFRON's Ultra-Affordable Educational Robot design competition was recognized with a Tribeca Disruptive Innovation Award in 2013.

Goldberg is co-founder of the Berkeley Center for New Media and served as its director from 2007 to 2010, and is co-founder and director of the Data and Democracy Initiative of the Center for Information Technology Research in the Interest of Society.

For his research, Goldberg was awarded the National Science Foundation Young Investigator Award in 1994, the National Science Foundation Presidential Faculty Fellowship in 1995, the Joseph F. Engelberger Robotics Award in 2000, the IEEE Major Educational Innovation Award in 2001. Goldberg was named IEEE Fellow in 2005 "for contributions to networked telerobotics and geometric algorithms for automation."

=== Artwork ===
In the field of collaborative filtering, Goldberg developed Eigentaste, a constant-time recommendation algorithm. It is featured in his online project, Jester, which is an online personalized joke recommender system. Goldberg's work in filtering algorithms has also extended to social media and foreign policy. His project, Opinion Space, is a data visualization which enables organization and analysis of constructive suggestions, using an intuitive graphical map of ideas. This platform is currently utilized for collective idea discovery by the U.S. Department of State, and corporations such as Unilever and GM.

Goldberg is founding director of UC Berkeley's Art, Technology, and Culture Lecture Series, established in 1997. This monthly speaker series brings artists, writers, and curators such as Laurie Anderson, Miranda July, Billy Klüver, David Byrne and Bruno Latour to give evening lectures and is free and open to the public.

Goldberg is editor of several books, including The Robot in the Garden: Telerobotics and Telepistemology in the Age of the Internet (MIT Press, 2000), and Beyond Webcams: An Introduction to Online Robotics (MIT Press, 2001), which both explore what is knowable at a distance.

Goldberg has worked on several net-based installation pieces from 1995 to today. One of his more well-known works, Legal Tender, allowed users to perform experiments on hundred dollar bills. After being given a sector of the bill to burn, users were flashed with the message of the illegality of tampering with U.S. currency. Follow up works such as Ouija 2000 and Public Keys built upon the idea of audience participation over the internet.

As an artist, Goldberg's work has been exhibited at the Whitney Biennial, Venice Biennale, Catharine Clark Gallery, Pompidou Centre (Paris), Walker Art Center, Ars Electronica (Linz Austria), Electronic Language International Festival (São Paulo), ZKM (Karlsruhe), ICC Biennale (Tokyo), Kwangju Biennale (Seoul), Artists Space, and The Kitchen (New York). He has held visiting positions at San Francisco Art Institute, MIT Media Lab, and the Art Center College of Design.

The Tribe, a short film he co-wrote with his wife, Tiffany Shlain (who directed and produced the film) was selected for the 2006 Sundance Film Festival and the 2006 Tribeca Film Festival. Their second film collaboration, Connected: An Autoblogography about Love, Death, and Technology, is a documentary feature film selected for the 2011 Sundance Film Festival.

Goldberg's Ballet Mori project, performed by the San Francisco Ballet, won an Izzie award at the Isadora Duncan Dance Awards in 2007. Goldberg collaborated with Gil Gershoni on Are We There Yet?, a solo acoustic art installation commissioned by the Creative Work Fund and exhibited in 2011 at the Contemporary Jewish Museum in San Francisco. Goldberg collaborated with Martin M. Wattenberg and Fernanda Viégas on the visual installation Bloom that is in the permanent collection of the Nevada Museum of Art.
