= Connected: An Autoblogography About Love, Death & Technology =

- Connected poster
- Directed by: Tiffany Shlain
- Written by: Tiffany Shlain; Carlton Evans; Sawyer Steele; Ken Goldberg
- Produced by: Tiffany Shlain; Carlton Evans
- Narrated by: Peter Coyote
- Edited by: Dalan McNabola; Tiffany Shlain; Sawyer Steele
- Music by: Gunnard Doboze
- Distributed by: Paladin Films (US) ro*co films (outside US)
- Release date: January 21, 2011 (Sundance Film Festival)
- Running time: 85 minutes
- Country: United States
- Language: English

Connected: An Autoblogography About Love, Death, & Technology is an autobiographical documentary film directed by Tiffany Shlain, dedicated to her father. The film depicts a year in which Tiffany Shlain has a high-risk pregnancy and her father, Leonard Shlain, has brain cancer. It uses a mix of animation, archival footage, and home movies, and has themes of connection between people and the world.

The production of the film took four years, and is Shlain's eighth film. Leonard Shlain died in 2009 and did not see the finished film.

== Release ==
The film premiered at the Sundance Film Festival in January 2011, and opened theatrically in 11 cities including San Francisco, Marin, Berkeley, Monterey, Seattle, Denver, Portland, LA and New York in the fall of 2011 in a theatrical tour. In 2012 Connected was selected by the U.S. State Department to tour with The American Film Showcase to represent America. With the American Film Showcase, the film was sent to embassies around the world and Tiffany Shlain traveled to South Africa and Israel to screen the film and teach filmmaking workshops. In Tiffany Shlain's AOL Original series, The Future Starts Here there is an episode in Season 2 called Punk Rock Diplomacy depicting about her tour with the American Film Showcase.

== Reception ==
Critical reception has been mixed. The film received 36% positive reviews on the aggregator Rotten Tomatoes.

== Awards and festivals ==
- Connected: An Autoblogography about Love, Death & Technology (2011)
  - Sundance Film Festival in 2011
  - 2013: Best Documentary - Mumbai Women's International Film Festival
  - 2013: Best Feature Film - Big Easy Int'l Film and Music Festival
  - 2012: Disruptive Innovation Award - Tribeca Film Festival
  - 2012: Award of Excellence - Accolade Competition
  - 2012: Selected by the United States Department of State & University of Southern California for the 2012 American Filmmaker Showcase
  - 2012: Best Documentary Feature - Atlanta International Documentary Film Festival
  - 2012: 4 Awards from The Los Angeles Movie Awards (Best in Show, Best Feature Doc, Best Director, Best Visual Effects)
  - 2012: Broadcast on Australian TV
  - 2011: Interdependence Film Prize - Berlin Film Festival & The Interdependence Movement
  - 2011: Women in Film Award - All Roads Grant National Geographic Society / Sundance Film Festival
  - 2011: Women of Vision Nomination - L'Oréal / Entertainment Weekly / Sundance Film Festival
  - 2011: Best Documentary Audience Award - Maui Film Festival
  - 2011: Best of the Fest Documentary Award - Portland Maine Film Festival
  - 2011: Metta Media Award - Dallas Video Fest
  - 2011: Honorable Mention - Jerusalem Film Festival
  - Connected screened at over 100 festivals between 2011 and 2014, including Sundance Film Festival, Ashland Independent Film Festival, Maui Film Festival, Jerusalem Film Festival, Cleveland International Film Festival, and Nashville Film Festival
  - The Margaret Herrick Library of the Academy of Motion Picture Arts and Sciences acquired the script for Connected for their permanent collection
