= Riane Eisler =

Austrian-American sociologist (born 1931)

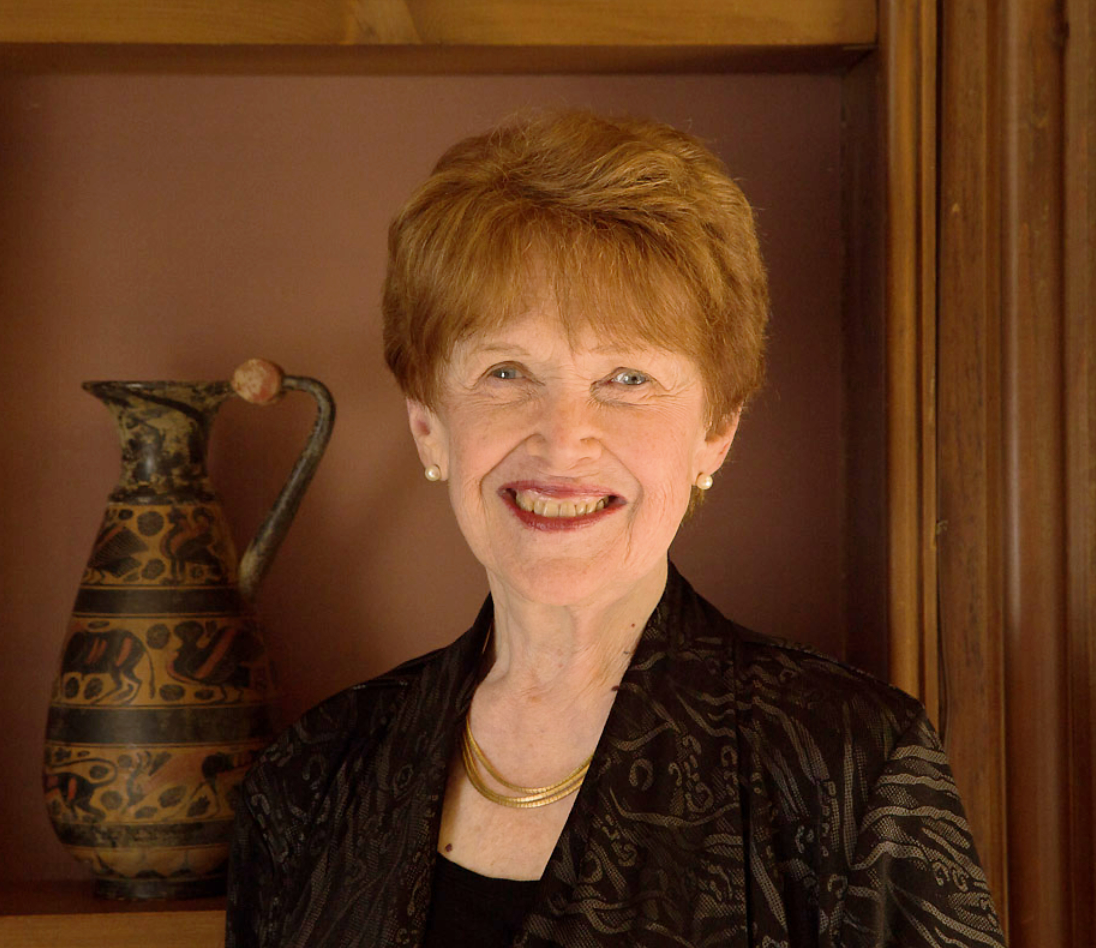
- Born: July 22, 1931 (age 95); Vienna, Austria
- Other name: Riane Tennenhaus Eisler
- Education: University of California
- Known for: The Chalice and the Blade (1987, 2022) The Real Wealth of Nations (2007) Nurturing Our Humanity (2019)
- Spouse: David Elliot Loye
- Website: www.rianeeisler.com; www.centerforpartnership.org

Riane Tennenhaus Eisler (born July 22, 1931) is an Austrian-born American systems scientist, futurist, attorney, and author who writes about the effect of gender and family politics historically on societies, and vice versa. She is best known for her 1987 book, The Chalice and the Blade, in which she coined the terms "partnership" and "dominator".

Eilsler has written and been interviewed in over 500 articles. Her work is covered in publications ranging from Scientific American, Behavioral Science, Futures, Political Psychology, The Christian Science Monitor, Challenge, and UNESCO Courier to Brain and Mind, Human Rights Quarterly, International Journal of Women's Studies, and World Encyclopedia of Peace, as well as chapters for books published by trade and university presses.

== Early life and education ==
Eisler was born in Vienna in 1931. In 1939, her family fled from the Nazis to Cuba. She and her parents lived in a slum in Havana for seven years, after which they emigrated to the United States, to Miami, New York, and Chicago before finally settling in Los Angeles.

Eisler has degrees in Sociology and Law from the University of California. She was part of the Phi Beta Kappa society.

== Career ==
Eisler is an attorney, legal scholar, systems scientist, and author.

=== Writing ===
Eisler has published thirteen books. Her first book, published in 1977, was Dissolution: No-Fault Divorce, Marriage, and the Future of Women. Her second book, published in 1979, was on the Equal Rights Amendment.

In 1987, Eisler published her third book, The Chalice and the Blade, which drew on ten years of multidisciplinary research. Popęda describes the essence of the book as showing "that human history is not the inevitable march of male domination, that for millenia our ancestors organized themselves around partnership rather than ranking, and that a more peaceful alternative isn't utopian, but [is] our recoverable past and likely future." The book sold over 500,000 copies and been translated into 30 languages. Ashley Montagu called the book "The most important book since Darwin's Origin of Species."

In 1995, Eisler published Sacred Pleasure, which Gloria Steinem called "Eisler's most stunning, far-reaching, and practical gift – both to readers and to a world that must change or perish."

In 2000, she published a memoir, The Gate.

In 2002, Eisler published The Power of Partnership. Marianne Williamson said that the book provides "the map to a world that works for all of us."

In 2019, Eisler Published Nurturing Our Humanity. Jennifer Siebel Newsom described by it saying it "outlines the roadmap for a world that leads with partnership – where empathy, care, and community are valued above all, and each can fulfill our full human potential."

Eisler was the Editor-in-Chief of the Interdisciplinary Journal of Partnership Studies at the University of Minnesota.

The children's troubadour Raffi, called Eisler's book on education, Tomorrow's Children "a pathway toward a child-honoring society."

=== The Center for Partnership Systems ===
In 1987, in partnership with her late husband David Elliot Loye, Eisler founded The Center for Partnership Studies, which was later renamed The Center for Partnership Systems. The organization is "dedicated to research, education, and building tools to construct economic and social systems that support human beings and the planet that sustains us."

As of 2024, the Center acts as a digital hub of resources, tools, connections, and community focused on partnership-oriented social change.

== Thought ==
=== Partnership vs. domination ===
In The Chalice and the Blade (1987) Eisler coined the terms "partnership" and "domination" to describe two underlying forms of society. These forms transcend conventional social categories like right/left, religious/secular, Eastern/Western, capitalist/socialist.

Eisler argued that partnership-oriented societies are characterized by peace, equity, gender equality, sustainability, and caring. Dominator-oriented societies are characterized by sexism and other forms of in-group versus out-group rankings such as racism and anti-Semitism, as well as chronic war (nuclear bombs, technological warfare), ecological destruction, and climate change.

Eisler's research, which references the work of archaeologists Marija Gimbutas, James Mellaart, and Ian Hodder, as well as anthropologist Douglas Fry, shows that for millennia most human societies were built on a partnership-oriented structure. This meant society supported the human capacity to give, nurture, and sustain life. Caregiving and shared responsibility were both important. According to archaeology, the fall into domination occurred between five and ten thousand years ago.

Eisler's research argues that the switch from partnership to domination led to a shift from in-group versus out-group attitudes. Group hierarchy and relationships were now based on factors such as sex, race, and other differences. Violence was ultimately the basis for maintaining these hierarchies, and was built into the system. The "conquest of nature," massive inequality, and devaluing the work of caring for people started to become common practice. The work of caring for our natural life-support systems was also undervalued, taken for granted, and removed from the money economy. Domination systems also normalize violence – from abusive authoritarian families, to the promotion of violence in modern politics, to destructive warfare between nations. Violence becomes a means to maintain power-over others as a social norm.

== Influence ==
Philosopher Terence McKenna referenced Eisler's work throughout his writings and talks, including in The Archaic Revival. In 1988, Eisler and McKenna gave a talk entitled "Man And Woman At The End Of History" together in Ojai CA and Mill Valley.

Eisler's term dominator culture has been used by writers ranging from bell hooks to Tao Lin.

== Awards ==
Among Eisler's awards are:

- 2022 Centers for Compassion, Humanitarian Award
- Honorary member, Club of Budapest (other honorary members include Mikhail Gorbachev)
- 2017 Visionary Award, Feminist Press
- 2014 Pioneer Award, Institute for Women's Leadership
- 2009 Distinguished Peace Leadership Award, Nuclear Age Peace Foundation (earlier awarded to the Dalai Lama)
- 2008 Honorary Ph.D. degree, Saybrook Institute
- 2008 Included in the award-winning Great Peacemakers book and online course
- 2005 Honorary Ph.D. degree, Case Western Reserve University
- 2000 Ethics Award, Foundation for Ethics and Meaning
- 1996 Humanist Pioneer Award
- 1996 Alice Paul ERA Education Award
- 1992 Shaler Adams Foundation award for work on Women's Rights as Human Rights
- 1990 National Women's Conference Committee Torchbearer's Award
- 1987 Congressional Award for Outstanding Contribution
- Monterey Distinguished Community Leader

== Selected bibliography ==
- 1977 — Dissolution: No-Fault Divorce, Marriage, and the Future of Women. New York: McGraw-Hill. ISBN 1583480293
- 1979 — The Equal Rights Handbook: What ERA Means to Your Life, Your Rights, and the Future. Avon. ISBN 1583480250
- 1987 – The Chalice and The Blade: Our History, Our Future. New York: Harper & Row. ISBN 0062502891
- 1990 — The Partnership Way: New Tools for Living and Learning, Healing Our Families, and Our World. San Francisco: Harper. ISBN 0062502905
- 1995 – Sacred Pleasure: Sex, Myth, and the Politics of the Body. San Francisco: Harper. ISBN 0062502832
- 2000 — Tomorrow's Children: A Blueprint for Partnership Education in the 21st Century. Boulder: Westview Press. ISBC 0813390400
- 2000 — The Gate. iUniverse. ISBN 0595001858
- 2002 — The Power of Partnership: Seven Relationships that Will Change Your Life. New World Library. ISBN 1577311787
- 2007 — The Real Wealth of Nations: Creating a Caring Economy. Berrett-Koehler Publishers. ISBN 1576753883
- 2019 — Nurturing Our Humanity: How Domination and Partnership Shape Our Brains, Lives, and Future. with Douglas P. Fry. Oxford University Press. ISBN 0190935723
- 2023 - Fog Busters: Eyes of Care, a children's' story with Victoria Friedman. ISBN 1958921556
