= Leonard Shlain =

American surgeon and writer

Leonard Shlain (August 28, 1937 – May 11, 2009) was an American surgeon, writer, and inventor. He was chairperson of laparoscopic surgery at the California Pacific Medical Center in San Francisco, and was an associate professor of surgery at University of California, San Francisco.

His books include Art & Physics: Parallel Visions in Space, Time, and Light (1991), The Alphabet Versus the Goddess (1998), Sex, Time and Power: How Women's Sexuality Shaped Human Evolution (2003), and Leonardo's Brain: Understanding da Vinci's Creative Genius (2014).

== Early life and career ==
Shlain was a native of Detroit who graduated from high school at the age of 15. After attending the University of Michigan, he earned an MD from Wayne State University School of Medicine at the age of 23. He served in the United States Army as a military base doctor in Saumur, France. Upon returning to the U.S., he did his medical internship at UCSF Medical Center at Mount Zion in San Francisco and began his surgical residency at Bellevue Hospital in New York City. He later completed the surgical residency at California Pacific Medical Center, where he remained as a medical professional for the rest of his career. He was also a member of the faculty at the University of California, San Francisco. He also contributed to Academic Press' Encyclopedia of Creativity (1999), edited by Mark Runco and Steven Pritzker.

== Personal life ==
Shlain had three children with Carole Lewis Jaffe:

- Kimberly Brooks (who is married to actor/comedian Albert Brooks),
- Physician Jordan Shlain, and
- Tiffany Shlain, filmmaker and founder of the Webby Awards

After he and Carole divorced, Shlain met and married his second wife, Superior Court Judge Ina Levin Gyemant. They lived in Mill Valley, California where he died on May 11, 2009 (at age 71) after a year long struggle with brain cancer. The film Connected: An Autoblogography About Love, Death & Technology (2011), directed by Shlain's daughter Tiffany, is in part a portrait of him.

== See also ==
- Military medicine
