= Walter Wink =

American biblical scholar and theologian, and progressive Christian activist

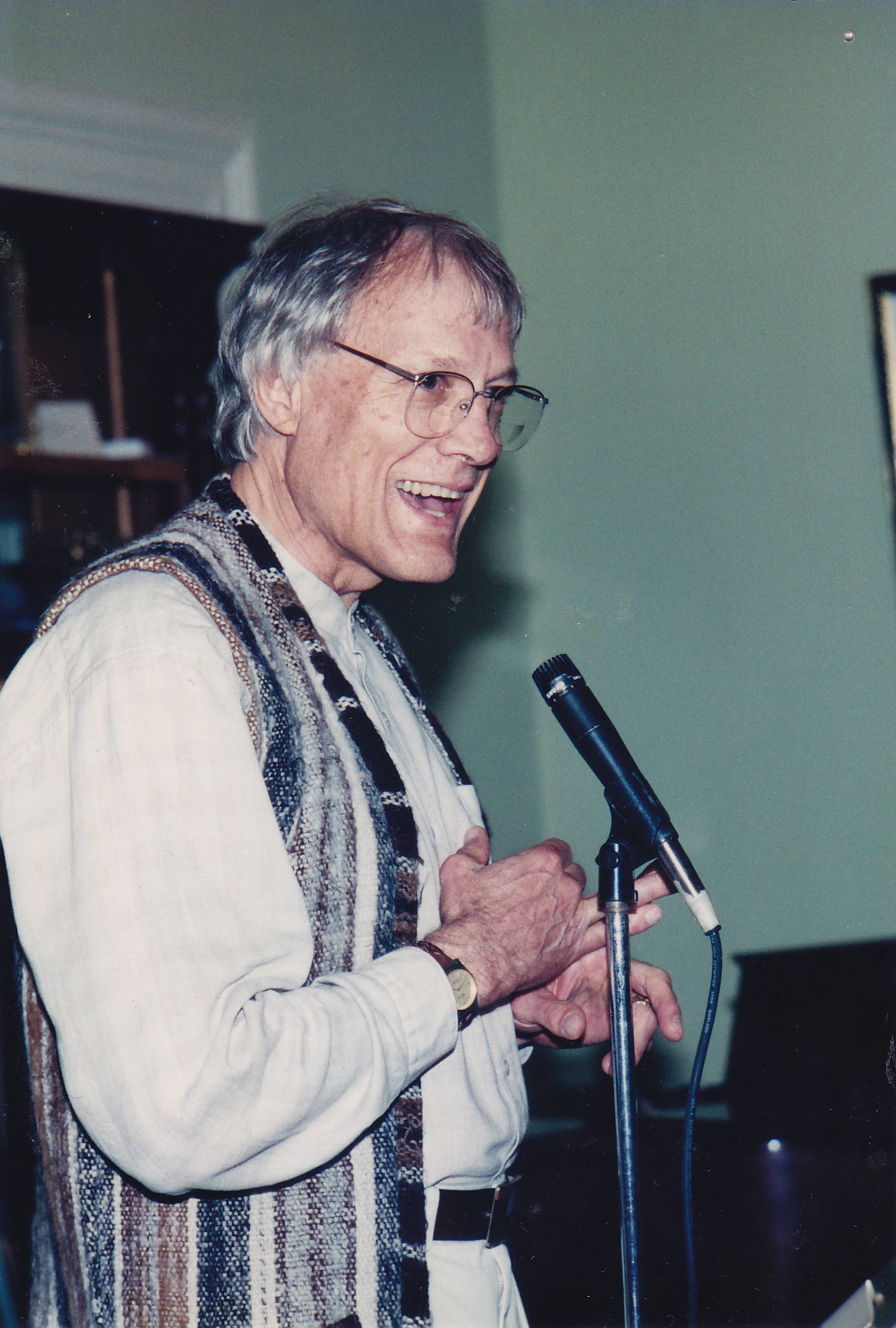
- Wink preaching at the Fellowship of Reconciliation
- Born: May 21, 1935; Dallas, Texas, United States
- Died: May 10, 2012 (aged 76); Sandisfield, Massachusetts, United States
- Occupations: minister, theologian, author
- Spouse: June Keener Wink
- Children: Rebecca Wink, Steve Wink, Chris Wink and Stepchildren: Kim Bergland, Kurt Bergland
- Writing career
- Language: English
- Website: walterwink.com

Walter Philip Wink (May 21, 1935 – May 10, 2012) was an American Biblical scholar, theologian, and activist who was an important figure in Progressive Christianity. Wink spent much of his career teaching at Auburn Theological Seminary in New York City. He was well known for his advocacy of and work related to nonviolent resistance and his seminal works on "The Powers", Naming the Powers (1984), Unmasking the Powers (1986), Engaging the Powers (1992), When the Powers Fall (1998), and The Powers that Be (1999), all of them commentaries on the Apostle Paul's ethic of spiritual warfare described here:

For we do not wrestle against flesh and blood, but against the rulers, against the authorities, against the cosmic powers over this present darkness, against the spiritual forces of evil in the heavenly places.

— Ephesians 6:12 (ESV)

Breaking with Christian hermeneutic tradition of Christian demonology, he interprets Paul's hierarchy of "rulers" to refer to imperial powers, with corresponding and political theologies and ideologies of state violence. Giving examples from ancient Babylon through the popular media of today, these are supported by, in a phrase he coined "the myth of redemptive violence".

== Early life and education ==
Wink was born in Dallas on May 21, 1935. His father first owned a hardware store and later worked as a salesman for the Fuller Brush Company. He was raised in a liberal Methodist church but also attended a Pentecostal congregation but while spending a summer in Oregon during college.

Wink earned a B.A. from Southern Methodist University in 1956, majoring in history, and minoring in philosophy and English. He completed his Master of Divinity in 1959 and his Ph.D. in 1963, both from Union Theological Seminary in New York City and was ordained as a Methodist minister in 1961.

== Career ==
After ordination, Wink served as Pastor of First United Methodist Church, in Hitchcock, Texas from 1962 to 1967. He then returned to Union Seminary as an assistant professor of New Testament, then associate professor of New Testament, from 1967 to 1976. After being denied tenure at Union, he began teaching at Auburn Theological Seminary, remaining there until his death, when he was professor emeritus. His faculty discipline was Biblical interpretation. In 1989–1990, he was a Peace Fellow at the United States Institute of Peace.

He was known for his work on power structures, his commentary on current political and cultural matters, and his contributions to the discourse on homosexuality and religion, pacifism, the relationship between psychology and biblical studies, and research related to the historical Jesus. Neal Stephenson likens some of Wink's ideas to "an epidemiology of power disorders", a phenomenology of oppression. Author Philip Yancey references Wink frequently in his work.

One of Wink's major avenues for teaching has been his leadership of workshops to church and other groups, based on his method of Bible study (The Bible in Human Transformation, 1973), and incorporating meditation, artwork, and movement. These workshops were often presented jointly with his wife, June Keener-Wink, a dancer and potter.

One of Walter Wink's sons—Chris Wink—is known as a founding member of the Blue Man Group.

== Partial bibliography ==
- John the Baptist in the Gospel Tradition. Cambridge University Press. 1968.
- The Bible in Human Transformation. Philadelphia: Fortress Press. 1973. ISBN 0-8006-1034-2.
- The Powers Trilogy:
  - Naming the Powers: The Language of Power in the New Testament, Philadelphia: Fortress Press, 1984. ISBN 0-8006-1786-X
  - Unmasking the Powers: The Invisible Forces That Determine Human Existence, Philadelphia: Fortress Press, 1986. ISBN 0-8006-1902-1
  - Engaging the Powers: Discernment and Resistance in a World of Domination, Minneapolis: Fortress Press, 1992. ISBN 0-8006-2646-X
- Violence and Nonviolence in South Africa: Jesus' third way. Philadelphia: New Society Publishers. 1987. ISBN 0-86571-116-X.
- Transforming Bible Study: A Leader's Guide (second ed.). Wipf & Stock. 1980. ISBN 978-1-60608-665-0.
- Proclamation 5: Holy Week, Year B, Minneapolis: Fortress Press, 1993. (out of print)
- Cracking the Gnostic Code: The Powers in Gnosticism, (Society of Biblical Literature Monograph Series), Atlanta: Scholars Press, 1993. ISBN 1-55540-860-5
- When the Powers Fall: Reconciliation in the Healing of Nations, Minneapolis: Fortress Press, 1998. ISBN 0-8006-3127-7; Swedish edition: Healing a Nation's Wounds: Reconciliation on the Road to Democracy (Uppsala, Sweden: Life and Peace Institute, 1997)
- The Powers That Be: Theology for a New Millennium, New York: Doubleday, 1999. ISBN 0-385-48752-5
- Homosexuality and Christian Faith: Questions of Conscience for the Churches (editor), Minneapolis: Fortress Press, 1999. ISBN 0-8006-3186-2
- Peace Is The Way: Writings on Nonviolence from the Fellowship of Reconciliation., (editor), Orbis Books, 2000. ISBN 1-57075-315-6
- John the Baptist in the Gospel Tradition, Wipf & Stock Publishers, 2001. ISBN 1-57910-529-7
- The Human Being: Jesus and the Enigma of the Son of the Man, Fortress Press, 2001. ISBN 0-8006-3262-1
- Jesus and Nonviolence: A Third Way, Augsburg Fortress, 2003. ISBN 0-8006-3609-0
- Just Jesus: My Struggle to Become Human, Image, 2014. ISBN 978-0307955814
- The System Belongs to God DVD, UMCom Productions, http://secure.umcom.org/Store/the-system-belongs-to-god.
