= The Chalice and the Blade =

Book by Riane Eisler

- Author: Riane Eisler
- Language: English
- Publication date: 1987
- Publication place: United States
- Media type: Print

The Chalice and The Blade: Our History, Our Future is a 1987 book by Riane Eisler. The author presents a conceptual framework for studying social systems with particular attention to how a society constructs roles and relations between the female and male halves of humanity.

== Overview ==
Eisler highlights the tension between what she calls the dominator or domination model and the more naturally feminine partnership model. Eisler proposes tension between these two underlies the span of human cultural evolution. She traces this tension in Western culture from prehistory to the present.

The book closes with two contrasting future scenarios. These challenge conventional views about cultural evolution up to the time of the book's publication. The book is now in 26 foreign editions, including most European languages as well as Chinese, Japanese, Urdu, Korean, Arabic, Hebrew, and Turkish. Briefly, her thesis is that, despite old narratives about an inherently flawed humanity, more and more evidence shows humanity is not doomed to perpetuate patterns of violence and oppression. Female values offer a partnership alternative with deep roots in the pre-Patriarchy paradigm of cultural evolution. No utopia is predicted; rather, a way of structuring society in more peaceful, equitable, and sustainable ways is envisioned.

== Proposed method of social analysis ==
The method of social analysis in the book is multidisciplinary in its study of relational dynamics. In contrast to earlier studies of society, this method concerns what kinds of social systems support the human capacity for consciousness, caring, and creativity, or conversely for insensitivity, cruelty, and destructiveness.

The study of relational dynamics is an application of systems analysis: the study of how different components of living systems interact to maintain one another and the larger whole of which they are a part. Drawing from a trans-disciplinary database, it applies this approach to a wide-ranging exploration of how humans think, feel, and behave individually and in groups. Its sources include cross-cultural anthropological and sociological surveys, and studies of individual societies as well as writings by historians, analyses of laws, moral codes, art, literature, scholarship from psychology, economics, education, political science, philosophy, religious studies, archaeology, the study of myths and legends; and data from more recent fields such as primatology, neuroscience, chaos theory, systems self-organizing theory, non-linear dynamics, gender studies, women's studies, and men's studies.

A distinguishing feature of the study of relational dynamics pays particular attention to matters marginalized or ignored in conventional male-oriented studies. It highlights the importance of how a society constructs relations between the male and female halves of humanity, as well as between them and their daughters and sons, taking into account findings from both the biological and social sciences showing the critical importance of the "private" sphere of family and other intimate relations in shaping beliefs and behaviors.

== New perspective on cultural evolution ==
The author compares two underlying types of social organization in which the cultural construction of gender roles and relations is key. Eisler places human societies on what she calls the partnership-domination continuum. At one end of the continuum are societies oriented to the partnership model. At the other are societies oriented to the dominator or domination model. These categories transcend conventional categories such as ancient vs. modern, Eastern vs. Western, religious vs. secular, rightist vs. leftist, and so on.

The domination model ranks man over man, man over woman, race over race, and religion vs. religion, with difference equated with superiority or inferiority. It comprises an authoritarian structure in both family and state or tribe, rigid male dominance, and a high degree of abuse and violence. The partnership model consists of a democratic and egalitarian structure in both the family and state or tribe, with hierarchies of actualization where power is empowering rather than disempowering (as in hierarchies of domination). There is also gender partnership and a low degree of abuse and violence, as it is not needed to maintain rigid top-down rankings.

== Content ==
In this book, Eisler traces tensions between these two models, starting in prehistory. It draws from many sources, including the study of myth and linguistics as well as archeological findings by the Indo-Europeanists J. P. Mallory and Marija Gimbutas and archeologists such as James Mellaart, Alexander Marshack, Andre Leroi-Gourhan, and Nikolas Platon.

Based on these findings, Eisler presents evidence how for the longest span of prehistory, cultures in the more fertile regions of the globe oriented primarily to the partnership model, which Eisler also calls a "gylany", a neologism for a society in which relationships between the sexes are an egalitarian partnership. This gender partnership was a core component of a more egalitarian, peaceful, and matrifocal culture with a focus on life-giving, centering on nurture. These societies once were widespread in Europe around the Mediterranean, and lasted well into the early Bronze Age in the Minoan civilization of Crete.

Later, culture skewed towards Patriarchy during a chaotic time of upheaval related to climate change and incursions of warlike, nomadic tribes. These peoples brought with them a domination system and imposed rigid rankings of domination, including the rigid domination by men of women and the equation of "real masculinity" with power and violence. This led to radical cultural transformation.

Eisler's book is not the only work describing this massive cultural shift. Other scholars have paid special attention to a radical change in gender relations. Historian Gerda Lerner details it in her Oxford University book The Creation of Patriarchy.

However, Eisler does not use the term "patriarchy." Nor does she use "matriarchy" to describe a more gender-balanced society, noting rule by fathers (patriarchy) and rule by mothers (matriarchy) can be two sides of a dominator coin. She proposed the real alternative is a partnership system or gylany.

Nonetheless, some critics have accused Eisler of writing about a "matriarchy" in prehistoric times. According to them, she claims earlier societies where women were not subordinate were ideal. Eisler does point out how more partnership-oriented societies described in The Chalice and the Blade were more peaceful and generally equitable; yet, she emphasizes they were not ideal. She further makes it clear the point is not returning to any "utopia" but rather using what we learn from our past to move forward to a more equitable and sustainable future.

Some archaeologists also question these earlier societies were more peaceful, especially critiques of Marija Gimbutas, one of Eisler's sources. This critique fits the conventional narrative of cultural evolution as a linear progression from "barbarism" to "civilization"—a narrative Eisler challenges in light of the brutality of "civilizations" ranging from Chinese, Indian, Arab, and European empires to Nazi Germany and Stalin's Soviet Union.

In addition, some archaeologists question whether the great profusion in these earlier cultures of female figurines, going back 30,000 years and perhaps even longer, indicates that they venerated a Goddess or Great Mother. When these figurines were first excavated in the 19th century, the men who found them in millennia-old caves called them Venus figurines (a term still used today).

== Subsequent confirmation ==
Further confirmation of Eisler's view of Neolithic society comes from archeologist Ian Hodder, who excavated Çatalhöyük, one of the largest Neolithic sites found to date. Hodder confirms gender equity as a key part of a more partnership-oriented social configuration in this generally equitable early farming site where there are no signs of destruction through warfare for over 1,000 years. At the same time, Ian Hodder found little evidence of matriarchy (matrilineality) in society. The only place where he found a clear division in symbolism is the kind of activity. Women were more often depicted with plants, and men in the role of a hunter. It is also worth noting that Hodder, unlike Eisler, described in detail male symbolism, namely painting, paintings in which men were most often depicted, often with beards.

In this 2004 Scientific American article Hodder writes—

Even analyses of isotopes in bones give no indication of divergence in lifestyle translating into differences in status and power between women and men... [which points to] a society in which sex is relatively unimportant in assigning social roles, with neither burials nor space in houses suggesting gender inequality.

Data from other world regions also supports the thesis of an earlier partnership direction. For example, after The Chalice and the Blade was published in China by the Chinese Academy of Social Sciences, a group of scholars at the Academy responded with the book The Chalice and The Blade in Chinese Culture: Gender Relations and Social Models, showing there was also in Chinese prehistory a massive cultural shift from more partnership-oriented cultures to a system of rigid domination in both the family and the state.

== See also ==
- Futures studies
