= Outline of robotics =

Overview of and topical guide to robotics

The following outline is provided as an overview of and topical guide to robotics:

Robotics is a branch of mechanical engineering, electrical engineering and computer science that deals with the design, construction, operation, and application of robots, as well as computer systems for their control, sensory feedback, and information processing. These technologies deal with automated machines that can take the place of humans in dangerous environments or manufacturing processes, or resemble humans in appearance, behaviour, and or cognition. Many of today's robots are inspired by nature contributing to the field of bio-inspired robotics.

The word "robot" was introduced to the public by Czech writer Karel Čapek in his play R.U.R. (Rossum's Universal Robots), published in 1920. The term "robotics" was coined by Isaac Asimov in his 1941 science fiction short-story "Liar!"

== Nature of robotics ==
Robotics can be described as:

- An applied science – scientific knowledge transferred into a physical environment.
  - A branch of computer science –
  - A branch of electrical engineering –
  - A branch of mechanical engineering –
- Research and development –
- A branch of technology –

== Branches of robotics ==
- Adaptive control – control method used by a controller which must adapt to a controlled system with parameters which vary, or are initially uncertain. For example, as an aircraft flies, its mass will slowly decrease as a result of fuel consumption; a control law is needed that adapts itself to such changing conditions.
- Aerial robotics – development of unmanned aerial vehicles (UAVs), commonly known as drones, aircraft without a human pilot aboard. Their flight is controlled either autonomously by onboard computers or by the remote control of a pilot on the ground or in another vehicle.
- Android science – interdisciplinary framework for studying human interaction and cognition based on the premise that a very humanlike robot (that is, an android) can elicit human-directed social responses in human beings.
- Anthrobotics – science of developing and studying robots that are either entirely or in some way human-like.
- Artificial intelligence – the intelligence of machines and the branch of computer science that aims to create it.
- Artificial neural networks – a mathematical model inspired by biological neural networks.
- Autonomous car – an autonomous vehicle capable of fulfilling the human transportation capabilities of a traditional car
- Autonomous research robotics –
- Bayesian network –
- BEAM robotics – a style of robotics that primarily uses simple analogue circuits instead of a microprocessor in order to produce an unusually simple design (in comparison to traditional mobile robots) that trades flexibility for robustness and efficiency in performing the task for which it was designed.
- Behavior-based robotics – the branch of robotics that incorporates modular or behavior based AI (BBAI).
- Bio-inspired robotics – making robots that are inspired by biological systems. Biomimicry and bio-inspired design are sometimes confused. Biomimicry is copying the nature while bio-inspired design is learning from nature and making a mechanism that is simpler and more effective than the system observed in nature.
- Biomimetic – see Bionics.
- Biomorphic robotics – a sub-discipline of robotics focused upon emulating the mechanics, sensor systems, computing structures and methodologies used by animals.
- Bionics – also known as biomimetics, biognosis, biomimicry, or bionical creativity engineering is the application of biological methods and systems found in nature to the study and design of engineering systems and modern technology.
- Biorobotics – a study of how to make robots that emulate or simulate living biological organisms mechanically or even chemically.
- Cloud robotics – is a field of robotics that attempts to invoke cloud technologies such as cloud computing, cloud storage, and other Internet technologies centered around the benefits of converged infrastructure and shared services for robotics.
- Cognitive robotics – views animal cognition as a starting point for the development of robotic information processing, as opposed to more traditional Artificial Intelligence techniques.
- Clustering –
- Computational neuroscience – study of brain function in terms of the information processing properties of the structures that make up the nervous system.
- Robot control – a study of controlling robots
- Robotics conventions –
- Data mining Techniques –
- Degrees of freedom – in mechanics, the degree of freedom (DOF) of a mechanical system is the number of independent parameters that define its configuration. It is the number of parameters that determine the state of a physical system and is important to the analysis of systems of bodies in mechanical engineering, aeronautical engineering, robotics, and structural engineering.
- Developmental robotics – a methodology that uses metaphors from neural development and developmental psychology to develop the mind for autonomous robots
- Digital control – a branch of control theory that uses digital computers to act as system controllers.
- Digital image processing – the use of computer algorithms to perform image processing on digital images.
- Dimensionality reduction – the process of reducing the number of random variables under consideration, and can be divided into feature selection and feature extraction.
- Distributed robotics –
- Electronic stability control – is a computerized technology that improves the safety of a vehicle's stability by detecting and reducing loss of traction (skidding).
- Evolutionary computation –
- Evolutionary robotics – a methodology that uses evolutionary computation to develop controllers for autonomous robots
- Extended Kalman filter –
- Flexible Distribution functions –
- Feedback control and regulation –
- Human–computer interaction – a study, planning and design of the interaction between people (users) and computers
- Human robot interaction – a study of interactions between humans and robots
- Intelligent vehicle technologies – comprise electronic, electromechanical, and electromagnetic devices - usually silicon micromachined components operating in conjunction with computer controlled devices and radio transceivers to provide precision repeatability functions (such as in robotics artificial intelligence systems) emergency warning validation performance reconstruction.
  - Computer vision –
  - Machine vision –
- Kinematics – study of motion, as applied to robots. This includes both the design of linkages to perform motion, their power, control and stability; also their planning, such as choosing a sequence of movements to achieve a broader task.
- Laboratory robotics – the act of using robots in biology or chemistry labs
- Robot learning – learning to perform tasks such as obstacle avoidance, control and various other motion-related tasks
- Direct manipulation interface – In computer science, direct manipulation is a human–computer interaction style which involves continuous representation of objects of interest and rapid, reversible, and incremental actions and feedback. The intention is to allow a user to directly manipulate objects presented to them, using actions that correspond at least loosely to the physical world.
- Manifold learning –
- Microrobotics – a field of miniature robotics, in particular mobile robots with characteristic dimensions less than 1 mm
- Motion planning – (a.k.a., the "navigation problem", the "piano mover's problem") is a term used in robotics for the process of detailing a task into discrete motions.
- Motor control – information processing related activities carried out by the central nervous system that organize the musculoskeletal system to create coordinated movements and skilled actions.
- Nanorobotics – the emerging technology field creating machines or robots whose components are at or close to the scale of a nanometer (10−9 meters).
- Passive dynamics – refers to the dynamical behavior of actuators, robots, or organisms when not drawing energy from a supply (e.g., batteries, fuel, ATP).
- Programming by Demonstration – an End-user development technique for teaching a computer or a robot new behaviors by demonstrating the task to transfer directly instead of programming it through machine commands.
- Quantum robotics – a subfield of robotics that deals with using quantum computers to run robotics algorithms more quickly than digital computers can.
- Rapid prototyping – automatic construction of physical objects via additive manufacturing from virtual models in computer aided design (CAD) software, transforming them into thin, virtual, horizontal cross-sections and then producing successive layers until the items are complete. As of June 2011, used for making models, prototype parts, and production-quality parts in relatively small numbers.
- Reinforcement learning – an area of machine learning in computer science, concerned with how an agent ought to take actions in an environment so as to maximize some notion of cumulative reward.
- Robot kinematics – applies geometry to the study of the movement of multi-degree of freedom kinematic chains that form the structure of robotic systems.
- Robot locomotion – collective name for the various methods that robots use to transport themselves from place to place.
- Robot programming –
- Robotic mapping – the goal for an autonomous robot to be able to construct (or use ) a map or floor plan and to localize itself in it
- Robotic surgery – computer-assisted surgery, and robotically assisted surgery are terms for technological developments that use robotic systems to aid in surgical procedures.
  - Robot-assisted heart surgery –
- Sensors – (also called detector) is a converter that measures a physical quantity and converts it into a signal which can be read by an observer or by an (today mostly electronic) instrument.
- Simultaneous localization and mapping – a technique used by robots and autonomous vehicles to build up a map within an unknown environment (without a priori knowledge), or to update a map within a known environment (with a priori knowledge from a given map), while at the same time keeping track of their current location.
- Software engineering – the application of a systematic, disciplined, quantifiable approach to the design, development, operation, and maintenance of software, and the study of these approaches; that is, the application of engineering to software.
- Space robotics – robots that operate in space, distinguishable from other spacecraft, such as satellites and flyby probes, by their locomotion and autonomous capabilities.
- Speech processing – study of speech signals and the processing methods of these signals. The signals are usually processed in a digital representation, so speech processing can be regarded as a special case of digital signal processing, applied to speech signal. Aspects of speech processing includes the acquisition, manipulation, storage, transfer and output of digital speech signals.
- Support vector machines – supervised learning models with associated learning algorithms that analyze data and recognize patterns, used for classification and regression analysis.
- Swarm robotics – involves large numbers of mostly simple physical robots. Their actions may seek to incorporate emergent behavior observed in social insects (swarm intelligence).
  - Ant robotics – swarm robots that can communicate via markings, similar to ants that lay and follow pheromone trails.
- Telepresence – refers to a set of technologies which allow a person to feel as if they were present, to give the appearance of being present, or to have an effect, via telerobotics, at a place other than their true location.
- Ubiquitous robotics – integrating robotic technologies with technologies from the fields of ubiquitous and pervasive computing, sensor networks, and ambient intelligence.

== Contributing fields ==
Robotics incorporates aspects of many disciplines including electronics, engineering, mechanics, software and arts. The design and control of robots relies on many fields knowledge, including:

- General
  - Biology: –
    - Biomechanics –
    - Bioinformatics –
  - Computer science:
    - Artificial Intelligence – Machine learning, Deep learning, Artificial neural network
    - Computational linguistics –
    - Cloud computing –
    - Cybernetics –
    - Modal logic –
  - Engineering:
    - Chemical engineering –
    - Electrical engineering – Electronic engineering, Control engineering, Telecommunications engineering, Computer engineering (Software engineering, Internet of Things)
    - Mechanical engineering – Aerospace engineering, Automotive engineering
    - Mechatronics engineering – Microelectromechanical engineering, Acoustical engineering
    - Nanoengineering –
    - Optical engineering –
    - Safety engineering –
  - Fiction – Robotics technology and its implications are major themes in science fiction and have provided inspiration for robotics development and cause for ethical concerns. Robots are portrayed in short stories and novels, in movies, in TV shows, in theatrical productions, in web based media, in computer games, and in comic books. See List of fictional robots and androids.
    - Film – See Robots in film.
    - Literature – fictional autonomous artificial servants have a long history in human culture. Today's most pervasive trope of robots, developing self-awareness and rebelling against their creators, dates only from the early 20th century. See Robots in literature.
    - The Three Laws of Robotics in popular culture
  - Military science –
  - Psychology –
    - Cognitive science –
    - Behavioral science –
  - Philosophy –
    - Ethics –
  - Physics –
    - Dynamics –
    - Kinematics –
- Fields of application – additionally, contributing fields include the specific field(s) a particular robot is being designed for. Expertise in surgical procedures and anatomy, for instance would be required for designing robotic surgery applications.

== Related fields ==
- Building automation –
  - Home automation –
- Assistive technology
- Cloud robotics

== Robots ==
A robot is a machine—especially one programmable by a computer—capable of carrying out a complex series of actions automatically. A robot can be guided by an external control device, or the control may be embedded within.

=== Types of robots ===
Autonomous robots – robots that are not controlled by humans:

- Aerobot – robot capable of independent flight on other planets
- Android – humanoid robot; resembling the shape or form of a human
- Automaton – early self-operating robot, performing exactly the same actions, over and over
- Animatronic – a robot that is usually used for theme parks and movie/tvs show set.
- Autonomous vehicle – vehicle equipped with an autopilot system, which is capable of driving from one point to another without input from a human operator
- Ballbot – dynamically stable mobile robot designed to balance on a single spherical wheel (i.e., a ball)
- Cyborg – also known as a cybernetic organism, a being with both biological and artificial (e.g. electronic, mechanical or robotic) parts
- Explosive ordnance disposal robot – mobile robot designed to assess whether an object contains explosives; some carry detonators that can be deposited at the object and activated after the robot withdraws
- Gynoid – humanoid robot designed to look like a human female
- Hexapod (walker) – a six-legged walking robot, using a simple insect-like locomotion
- Industrial robot – reprogrammable, multifunctional manipulator designed to move material, parts, tools, or specialized devices through variable programmed motions for the performance of a variety of tasks
  - 3D printer
- Insect robot – small robot designed to imitate insect behaviors rather than complex human behaviors.
- Microbot – microscopic robots designed to go into the human body and cure diseases
- Military robot – exosuit which is capable of merging with its user for enhanced strength, speed, handling, etc.
- Mobile robot – self-propelled and self-contained robot that is capable of moving over a mechanically unconstrained course.
  - Cruise missile – robot-controlled guided missile that carries an explosive payload.
- Music entertainment robot – robot created to perform music entertainment by playing custom made instrument or human developed instruments.
- Nanobot – the same as a microbot, but smaller. The components are at or close to the scale of a nanometer (10^{−9} meters).
- Prosthetic robot – programmable manipulator or device replacing a missing human limb.
- Rover – a robot with wheels designed to walk on other planets' terrain
- Sex robot
- Service robot – machines that extend human capabilities.
- Snakebot – robot or robotic component resembling a tentacle or elephant's trunk, where many small actuators are used to allow continuous curved motion of a robot component, with many degrees of freedom. This is usually applied to snake-arm robots, which use this as a flexible manipulator. A rarer application is the snakebot, where the entire robot is mobile and snake-like, so as to gain access through narrow spaces.
- Teleoperated robot – area of robotics concerned with the control of semi-autonomous robots from a distance
- Surgical robot – remote manipulator used for keyhole surgery
- Walking robot – robot capable of locomotion by walking. Owing to the difficulties of balance, two-legged walking robots have so far been rare, and most walking robots have used insect-like multilegged walking gaits.

==== By mode of locomotion ====
Mobile robots may be classified by:

- The environment in which they travel:
  - Land or home robots. They are most commonly wheeled, but also include legged robots with two or more legs (humanoid, or resembling animals or insects).
  - Aerial robots are usually referred to as unmanned aerial vehicles (UAVs).
  - Underwater robots are usually called autonomous underwater vehicles (AUVs).
  - Polar robots, designed to navigate icy, crevasse filled environments
- The device they use to move, mainly:
  - Legged robot – human-like legs (i.e. an android) or animal-like legs
  - Tracks
  - Wheeled robot

=== Robot components and design features ===
- Actuator – motor that translates control signals into mechanical movement. The control signals are usually electrical but may, more rarely, be pneumatic or hydraulic. The power supply may likewise be any of these. It is common for electrical control to be used to modulate a high-power pneumatic or hydraulic motor.
  - Linear actuator – form of motor that generates a linear movement directly.
- Delta robot – tripod linkage, used to construct fast-acting manipulators with a wide range of movement.
- Drive power – energy source or sources for the robot actuators.
- End-effector – accessory device or tool specifically designed for attachment to the robot wrist or tool mounting plate to enable the robot to perform its intended task. (Examples may include gripper, spot-weld gun, arc-weld gun, spray- paint gun, or any other application tools.)
- Forward chaining – process in which events or received data are considered by an entity to intelligently adapt its behavior.
- Haptic – tactile feedback technology using the operator's sense of touch. Also sometimes applied to robot manipulators with their own touch sensitivity.
- Hexapod (platform) – movable platform using six linear actuators. Often used in flight simulators and fairground rides, they also have applications as a robotic manipulator.

See Stewart platform

- Hydraulics – control of mechanical force and movement, generated by the application of liquid under pressure. cf. pneumatics.
- Kalman filter – mathematical technique to estimate the value of a sensor measurement, from a series of intermittent and noisy values.
- Klann linkage – simple linkage for walking robots.
- Manipulator – gripper. A robotic 'hand'.
  - Parallel manipulator – articulated robot or manipulator based on a number of kinematic chains, actuators and joints, in parallel. cf. serial manipulator.
  - Remote manipulator – manipulator under direct human control, often used for work with hazardous materials.
  - Serial manipulator – articulated robot or manipulator with a single series kinematic chain of actuators. cf. parallel manipulator.
- Muting – deactivation of a presence-sensing safeguarding device during a portion of the robot cycle.
- Pendant – Any portable control device that permits an operator to control the robot from within the restricted envelope (space) of the robot.
- Pneumatics – control of mechanical force and movement, generated by the application of compressed gas. cf. hydraulics.
- Servo – motor that moves to and maintains a set position under command, rather than continuously moving
- Servomechanism – automatic device that uses error-sensing negative feedback to correct the performance of a mechanism
- Single point of control – ability to operate the robot such that initiation or robot motion from one source of control is possible only from that source and cannot be overridden from another source
- Slow speed control – mode of robot motion control where the velocity of the robot is limited to allow persons sufficient time either to withdraw the hazardous motion or stop the robot
- Stepper motor – motor whose rotation is divided into intervals called 'steps'. The motor can then rotate through a controlled number of steps which allows an exact awareness of the rotated distance.
- Stewart platform – movable platform using six linear actuators, hence also known as a Hexapod
- Subsumption architecture – robot architecture that uses a modular, bottom-up design beginning with the least complex behavioral tasks
- Teach mode – control state that allows the generation and storage of positional data points effected by moving the robot arm through a path of intended motions

=== Specific robots ===
- Aura (satellite) – robotic spacecraft launched by NASA in 2004 which collects atmospheric data from Earth
- Chandra X-ray Observatory – robotic spacecraft launched by NASA in 1999 to collect astronomical data
- Justin
- Robonaut – development project conducted by NASA to create humanoid robots capable of using space tools and working in similar environments to suited astronauts
- Unimate – the first off-the-shelf industrial robot, of 1961

==== Real robots by region ====
===== Robots from Australia =====
- GuRoo
- UWA Telerobot
- Boeing MQ-28 Ghost Bat

===== Robots from Britain =====
- Black Knight
- eSTAR
- Freddy II
- George
- Robop
- Shadow Hand
- Silver Swan
- Talisman UUV
- Wheelbarrow
- Ameca

===== Robots from Canada =====
- ANAT AMI-100
- ANATROLLER ARE-100
- ANATROLLER ARI-100
- ANATROLLER ARI-50
- ANATROLLER Dusty Duct Destroyer
- Canadarm2
- Dextre
- hitchBOT

===== Robots from China =====
- FemiSapien
- Meinü robot
- RoboSapien
- Robosapien v2
- RS Media
- Sanbot robot
- Xianxingzhe
- Xiaoyi (Robot)

===== Robots from Croatia =====
- DOK-ING EOD
- TIOSS

===== Robots from Czech Republic =====
- SyRoTek

===== Robots from France =====
- Air-Cobot – collaborative mobile robot able to inspect aircraft during maintenance operations
- Digesting Duck
- Jessiko
- Nabaztag
- Nao

===== Robots from Germany =====
- BionicKangaroo – biomimetic robot model designed by Festo
- Care-Providing Robot FRIEND
- LAURON
- Marvin

===== Robots from Italy =====
- iCub –
- IsaacRobot
- WalkMan
- Leonardo's robot

===== Robots from Japan =====
- AIBO
- ASIMO
- EMIEW
- EMIEW 2
- Enon
- Evolta
- Gakutensoku
- HAL 5
- HOAP
- Ibuki
- KHR-1
- Omnibot
- Plen
- QRIO
- R.O.B.
- SCARA
- Toyota Partner Robot
- Wakamaru

===== Robots from Mexico =====
- Don Cuco El Guapo

===== Robots from the Netherlands =====
- Adelbrecht
- Flame
- Phobot
- Senster

===== Robots from New Zealand =====
- The Trons

===== Robots from Portugal =====
- RAPOSA

===== Robots from Qatar =====
- Robot jockey

===== Robots from Russia (or former Soviet Union) =====
- Lunokhod 1
- Lunokhod 2
- Teletank

===== Robots from South Korea =====
- Albert Hubo
- EveR-1
- HUBO
- MAHRU
- Musa

===== Robots from Spain =====
- AISoy1
- Maggie
- REEM
- Tico

===== Robots from Switzerland =====
- Alice mobile robot
- E-puck mobile robot
- Pocketdelta robot
- Shameer shami robot

===== Robots from the United States =====
- Albert One
- Allen
- ATHLETE
- Atlas
- Baxter
- Ballbot
- avbotz Baracuda XIV
- Berkeley Lower Extremity Exoskeleton
- BigDog
- Boe-Bot
- CISBOT
- Coco
- Cog
- Crusher
- Dragon Runner
- EATR
- Elektro
- Entomopter
- Haile
- Hardiman
- HERO
- Johns Hopkins Beast
- Kismet
- Leonardo
- LOPES
- LORAX
- Nomad 200
- Nomad rover
- Octobot (robot)
- Opportunity rover
- Programmable Universal Machine for Assembly
- Push the Talking Trash Can
- RB5X
- Robonaut
- Shakey the Robot
- Sojourner
- Spirit rover
- Turtle
- Unimate
- Zoë
- Pleo

===== Robots from Vietnam =====
- TOPIO –

===== International robots =====
- European Robotic Arm –
- Curiosity Rover for NASA on Mars Science Laboratory space mission –

==== Fictional robots by region ====
===== Fictional robots from the United Kingdom =====
====== From British literature ======
- HAL 9000 (Arthur C. Clarke) –

====== From British radio ======
- Marvin the Paranoid Android (Douglas Adams) –

====== From British television ======
- Kryten (Rob Grant, Doug Naylor, David Ross, Robert Llewellyn) {Red Dwarf} –
- Talkie Toaster – (Rob Grant, Doug Naylor, John Lenahan, David Ross) {Red Dwarf}
- K-9 (Doctor Who) –
- Robotboy – (Bob Camp, Charlie Bean, Heath Kenny, Prof Moshimo, Laurence Bouvard) {Robotboy}
- K.T., Eric and Desiree in Robert's Robots

===== Fictional robots from the Czech Republic =====
====== From Czech plays ======
- Daemon – (Karel Čapek) {R.U.R. (Rossum's Universal Robots)}
- Helena – (Karel Čapek) {R.U.R. (Rossum's Universal Robots)}
- Marius – (Karel Čapek) {R.U.R. (Rossum's Universal Robots)}
- Primus – (Karel Čapek) {R.U.R. (Rossum's Universal Robots)}
- Radius – (Karel Čapek) {R.U.R. (Rossum's Universal Robots)}
- Sulla – (Karel Čapek) {R.U.R. (Rossum's Universal Robots)}

===== Fictional robots from France =====
====== From French ballets ======
- Coppélia – (Arthur Saint-Leon, Léo Delibes) {Coppélia}

====== From French literature ======
- Hadaly – (Auguste Villiers de l'Isle-Adam) {The Future Eve}

===== Fictional robots from Germany =====
====== From German film ======
- Maschinenmensch – (Fritz Lang, Thea von Harbou, Brigitte Helm) {Metropolis}

====== From German literature ======
- Maschinenmensch – (Thea von Harbou)
- Olimpia – (E. T. A. Hoffmann) {Der Sandmann}

===== Fictional robots from Japan =====
====== From anime ======
- Braiger – (Shigeo Tsubota, Tokichi Aoki) {Ginga Senpuu Braiger}
- Combattler V – (Tadao Nagahama, Saburo Yatsude) {Super Electromagnetic Robo Combattler V}
- Daimos – (Tadao Nagahama, Saburo Yatsude) {Brave Leader Daimos}
- Groizer X – (Go Nagai) {Groizer X}
- Mechander Robo – (Jaruhiko Kaido) {Mechander Robo (Gasshin Sentai Mekandaa Robo)}
- Raideen – (Yoshiyuki Tomino, Tadao Nagahama) {Brave Raideen}
- Trider G7 – (Hajime Yatate) {Invincible Robo Trider G7}
- Voltes V – (Tadao Nagahama, Saburo Yatsude) {Super Electromagnetic Machine Voltes V}

====== From manga ======
- Astro Boy – (Osamu Tezuka) {Astro Boy}
- Doraemon – (Fujiko Fujio) {Doraemon}
- Getter Robo – (Go Nagai, Ken Ishikawa) {Getter Robo}
- Grendizer – (Go Nagai) {UFO Robo Grendizer}
- Mazinger Z – (Go Nagai) {Mazinger Z}
- Tetsujin 28 – (Mitsuteru Yokoyama) {Tetsujin 28 - Go!}

===== Fictional robots from the United States =====
====== From American comics ======
- Amazo – (Gardner Fox) {DC Comics}
- Annihilants – (Alex Raymond) {Flash Gordon}

====== From American film ======
- C-3PO – (George Lucas, Anthony Daniels) {Star Wars}
- ED-209 – (Paul Verhoeven, Craig Hayes, Phil Tippett) {RoboCop}
- Fix-Its – (Burton Weinstein, Robert Cooper, Tony Hudson) {*batteries not included}
- Gort – (Robert Wise, Harry Bates, Edmund H. North, Lock Martin) {The Day the Earth Stood Still}
- Johnny Five – (Tim Blaney, Syd Mead) {Short Circuit}
- R2-D2 – (George Lucas, Kenny Baker, Ben Burtt) {Star Wars}
- Robby the Robot – (Fred M. Wilcox, Robert Kinoshita, Frankie Darro, Marvin Miller) {Forbidden Planet}
- The Terminator – (James Cameron, Gale Anne Hurd) {The Terminator}
- WALL-E and EVE – (Andrew Stanton, Ben Burtt, Elissa Knight) {WALL-E}

====== From American literature ======
- Adam Link – (Eando Binder) {I, Robot}
- Gnut – (Harry Bates) {Farewell to the Master}
- Robbie – (Isaac Asimov) {I, Robot}
- The Steam Man of the Prairies – (Edward S. Ellis) {The Steam Man of the Prairies}
- Tik-Tok – (L. Frank Baum) {Ozma of Oz}

====== From American television ======
- Bender Bending Rodriguez – (Matt Groening, David X. Cohen, John DiMaggio) {Futurama}
- Bobert – (Ben Bocquelet, Kerry Shale) {The Amazing World of Gumball}
- Cambot – Gypsy, Crow T. Robot, and Tom Servo (Joel Hodgson, Trace Beaulieu, Bill Corbett, Josh Weinstein, Jim Mallon, Patrick Brantseg) {Mystery Science Theater 3000}
- Data – (Gene Roddenberry, Brent Spiner) {Star Trek: The Next Generation}
- Grounder and Scratch – (Phil Hayes, Garry Chalk) {Adventures of Sonic the Hedgehog}
- GIR – (Jhonen Vasquez, Rosearik Rikki Simons) {Invader Zim}
- Jenny Wakeman – (Rob Renzetti, Janice Kawaye) {My Life as a Teenage Robot}
- Robot B-9 – (Irwin Allen, Robert Kinoshita, Bob May, Dick Tufeld) {Lost in Space}
- XR – (Larry Miller) {Buzz Lightyear of Star Command}

== History of robotics ==
- History of robots

== Future of robotics ==
- Artificial general intelligence
- Soft robotics

== Robotics development and development tools ==
- Arduino – current platform of choice for small-scale robotic experimentation and physical computing.
- CAD/CAM (computer-aided design and computer-aided manufacturing) – these systems and their data may be integrated into robotic operations.
- Cleanroom – environment that has a low level of environmental pollutants such as dust, airborne microbes, aerosol particles and chemical vapors; often used in robot assembly.
- Microsoft Robotics Developer Studio
- Player Project
- Robot Operating System
- Gazebo, a robotics simulator

== Robotics principles ==
- Artificial intelligence – intelligence of machines and the branch of computer science that aims to create it.
- Degrees of freedom – extent to which a robot can move itself; expressed in terms of Cartesian coordinates (x, y, and z) and angular movements (yaw, pitch, and roll).
- Emergent behaviour – complicated resultant behaviour that emerges from the repeated operation of simple underlying behaviours.
- Envelope (Space), Maximum – volume of space encompassing the maximum designed movements of all robot parts including the end-effector, workpiece, and attachments.
- Humanoid – resembling a human being in form, function, or both.
- Roboethics
- Three Laws of Robotics – coined by the science fiction author Isaac Asimov, one of the first serious considerations of the ethics and robopsychological aspects of robotics.
- Tool Center Point (TCP) – origin of the tool coordinate system.
- Uncanny valley – hypothesized point at which humanoid robot behavior and appearance is so close to that of actual humans yet not precise or fully featured enough as to cause a sense of revulsion.

== Robotics companies ==
- 3D Robotics
- ABB Group
- Aethon Inc.
- Alphabet Inc.
- Amazon.com
- Anki Inc.
- Autonomous Solutions
- Boston Dynamics – acquired by Google in 2014. Maker of Atlas, and BigDog.
- Bot & Dolly – acquired by Google in 2014.
- CANVAS Technology
- Carbon Robotics
- Clearpath Robotics
- Cyberdyne, Inc.
- Delphi Automotive
- DJI (company)
- Ekso Bionics
- Energid Technologies
- Epson Robots
- FANUC Robotics
- Fetch Robotics
- Flexiv Robotics
- Foxconn
- Fujitsu
- Google DeepMind – formerly DeepMind Technologies, acquired by Google in 2014.
- GreyOrange
- Holomini – acquired by Google in 2014
- Honda – maker of ASIMO
- IAM Robotics
- Industrial Perception – acquired by Google in 2014
- Intuitive Surgical
- iRobot
- Jibo
- Kawasaki Heavy Industries
- Knightscope
- KUKA
- Lockheed Martin
- Locus Robotics
- Meka Robotics – acquired by Google in 2014
- Omron Adept
- Open Bionics
- Redwood Robotics – acquired by Google in 2014
- Rethink Robotics
- ReWalk Robotics
- RoboCV
- Robotiq
- Robotis – maker of the Robotis Bioloid
- Samsung
- Savioke
- Schaft Inc – acquired by Google in 2014
- SCHUNK
- Seegrid
- SIASUN Robot & Automation Co. Ltd. – maker of the SIASUN UAV
- SoftBank Robotics
- Soil Machine Dynamics Ltd
- Swisslog
- Titan Medical Inc
- TOSY
- Toyota
- UBTECH Robotics Corp. - maker of interactive humanoid robot Alpha 2
- ULC Robotics
- Universal Robotics
- Vecna Technologies
- Verb Surgical
- VEX Robotics
- Yamaha
- Yaskawa

== Robotics organizations ==
- FIRST (For Inspiration and Recognition of Science and Technology) – organization founded by inventor Dean Kamen in 1989 in order to develop ways to inspire students in engineering and technology fields. It founded various robotics competitions for elementary and high school students.
- IEEE Robotics and Automation Society
- Robotics Institute
- SRI International

== Robotics competitions ==
Robot competition

- National ElectroniX Olympiad
- ABU Robocon
- BEST Robotics
- Botball
- DARPA Grand Challenge – prize competition for American autonomous vehicles, funded by the Defense Advanced Research Projects Agency, the most prominent research organization of the United States Department of Defense.
  - DARPA Grand Challenge (2004)
  - DARPA Grand Challenge (2005)
  - DARPA Grand Challenge (2007)
- DARPA Robotics Challenge – prize competition funded by the US Defense Advanced Research Projects Agency. Held from 2012 to 2014, it aims to develop semi-autonomous ground robots that can do "complex tasks in dangerous, degraded, human-engineered environments."
  - Initial task requirements
    1. Drive a utility vehicle at the site
    2. Travel dismounted across rubble
    3. Remove debris blocking an entryway
    4. Open a door and enter a building
    5. Climb an industrial ladder and traverse an industrial walkway
    6. Use a tool to break through a concrete panel
    7. Locate and close a valve near a leaking pipe
    8. Connect a fire hose to a standpipe and turn on a valve
  - Teams making the finals
    1. SCHAFT
    2. IHMC Robotics
    3. Tartan Rescue
    4. MIT
    5. RoboSimian
    6. Team TRACLabs
    7. WRECS
    8. TROOPER
- Defcon Robot Contest
- Duke Annual Robo-Climb Competition
- Eurobot
- European Land-Robot Trial
- FIRST Lego League Explore
- FIRST Lego League Challenge
- FIRST Robotics Competition
- FIRST Tech Challenge
- International Aerial Robotics Competition
- Micromouse
- RoboCup
- Robofest
- RoboGames
- RoboSub
- Student Robotics
- UAV Outback Challenge
- World Robot Olympiad

== People influential in the field of robotics ==
- Asimov, Isaac – science fiction author who coined the term "robotics", and wrote the three laws of robotics.
- Čapek, Karel – Czech author who coined the term "robot" in his 1921 play, Rossum's Universal Robots.
- Devol, George – inventor of Unimate, the first industrial robot.
- Engelberger, Joseph – robotics pioneer who co-founded Unimation, the first robotics company, and helped develop and commercialize Unimate.
- Raibert, Marc – roboticist and founder of Boston Dynamics, known for pioneering work in dynamic and legged robots.

== Robotics in popular culture ==
- Droid
- List of fictional cyborgs
- List of fictional robots and androids
- List of fictional gynoids
- Real Robot
- Super Robot
- Robot Hall of Fame
- Waldo – a short story by Robert Heinlein, that gave its name to a popular nickname for remote manipulators.

== See also ==
- Outline of automation
- Outline of machines
- Outline of technology
- For classes and types of robots see Category:Robots.
- Automatic waste container
- Bina48
- Cyberflora
- Educational robotics
- Electrointerpretation
- History of technology
- List of emerging robotic technologies
- List of robotics companies
- List of robotics journals
- List of robotics occupations
- Microsoft Robotics Studio
- Mobile manipulator
- Mobile Robot Programming Toolkit
- NASA robots
- Open-source robotics
- Open-source hardware
- Robotics suite
  - Category:Robotics suites
- Whegs
- VEX Robotics
- Artificial Life
- Control systems
- Cloud robotics
- Mechatronics
- Roboticists
