= Almost Human: Making Robots Think =

Book by Lee Gutkind

- Title page for Almost Human: Making Robots Think (2007)
- Author: Lee Gutkind
- Publisher: WW Norton
- Publication date: March 2007
- Media type: Hardcover
- Pages: 284
- ISBN: 978-0-393-05867-3

Almost Human: Making Robots Think is a book written by Lee Gutkind founder of Creative Nonfiction. Gutkind spent six years as a "fly on the wall" researcher at the Robotics Institute at Carnegie-Mellon University in Pittsburgh. He observed scientists and students working to design, build, and test robots so advanced that they will one day be able to work alongside or, in some cases, even replace humans. Almost Human is an intense portrait of the robotic subculture and the challenging quest for robot autonomy. Almost Human is 330 pages long and is published by W.W. Norton. In May 2007 Gutkind appeared as a guest author on The Daily Show with Jon Stewart to talk about robots, the future, and his book.

== Featured Robots ==
=== Nomad ===
From June 15 to July 31 of 1997, Carnegie Mellon University deployed the robotic Nomad rover to traverse the Atacama Desert of Northern Chile. Nomad traveled an unprecedented 215 km in 45 days, remotely controlled and driven from both the Carnegie Science Center in Pittsburgh, PA, and the Intelligent Mechanisms Group laboratory at Ames Research Center (ARC). This NASA-funded research program tested technologies critical to planetary exploration and enabled scientists to perform remote geological experiments. The total cost of developing Nomad and conducting the desert trek was $1.6 million.

Nomad was operated entirely under remote control from the U.S., including telepresence and autonomous guidance with simulated 4- to 15-minute time delays such as those that would be encountered on missions to Mars. 20 of the 215 km it traveled were done under autonomous control.

Nomad is about the size of a small car and massed 550 kg. To maneuver through rough terrain, the robot has four-wheel drive and four-wheel steering with a chassis that expands to improve stability and travel over various terrain conditions. Four aluminum wheels with cleats provide traction in soft sand. For this terrestrial experiment, power was supplied by a gasoline generator that enabled the robot to travel at speeds up to about one mile per hour. Nomad employed a panospheric camera, a high-resolution video camera that focuses up into a hemispheric mirror similar to a store security mirror. The video view includes all of the ground up to the horizon in the circle surrounding Nomad. The robot was developed by the human mind.

=== The RoboCup Robots ===
RoboCup is an international robotics competition founded in 1993. The aim is to develop autonomous soccer robots with the intention of promoting research and education in the field of artificial intelligence. The name RoboCup is a contraction of the competition's full name, "Robot Soccer World Cup", But there are many other stages of the competition such as "Search and Rescue" and "Robot Dancing".

The official goal of the project:

By mid-21st century, a team of fully autonomous humanoid robot soccer players shall win the soccer game, complying with the official rule of the FIFA, against the winner of the most recent World Cup.

=== Zoë ===
Zoë is a solar-powered autonomous robot with sensors able to detect microorganisms and map the distribution of life in the Atacama Desert of northern Chile, duplicating tasks that could be used in future exploration of Mars.

=== GRACE ===
GRACE, which stands for Graduate Robot Attending a ConferencE, is a B21R Mobile Robot build by RWI. It has a panning platform on which a screen shows an emotionally expressive face, as well as sensors to help it move through crowded environments, including touch sensors and a scanning laser range finder. GRACE has high-quality synthesized speech and can understand others using speech recognition software.

At the 2002 conference, GRACE started at the front door of the conference venue, found the elevator by asking participants and made her way to the registration area. GRACE tried to find the end of the line, finally elbowing the end person in the line out of the way (either because it was unable to tell if the person was in fact in line, or because it did not want to wait!). GRACE then waited patiently and registered successfully.
