= Scarab (rover) =

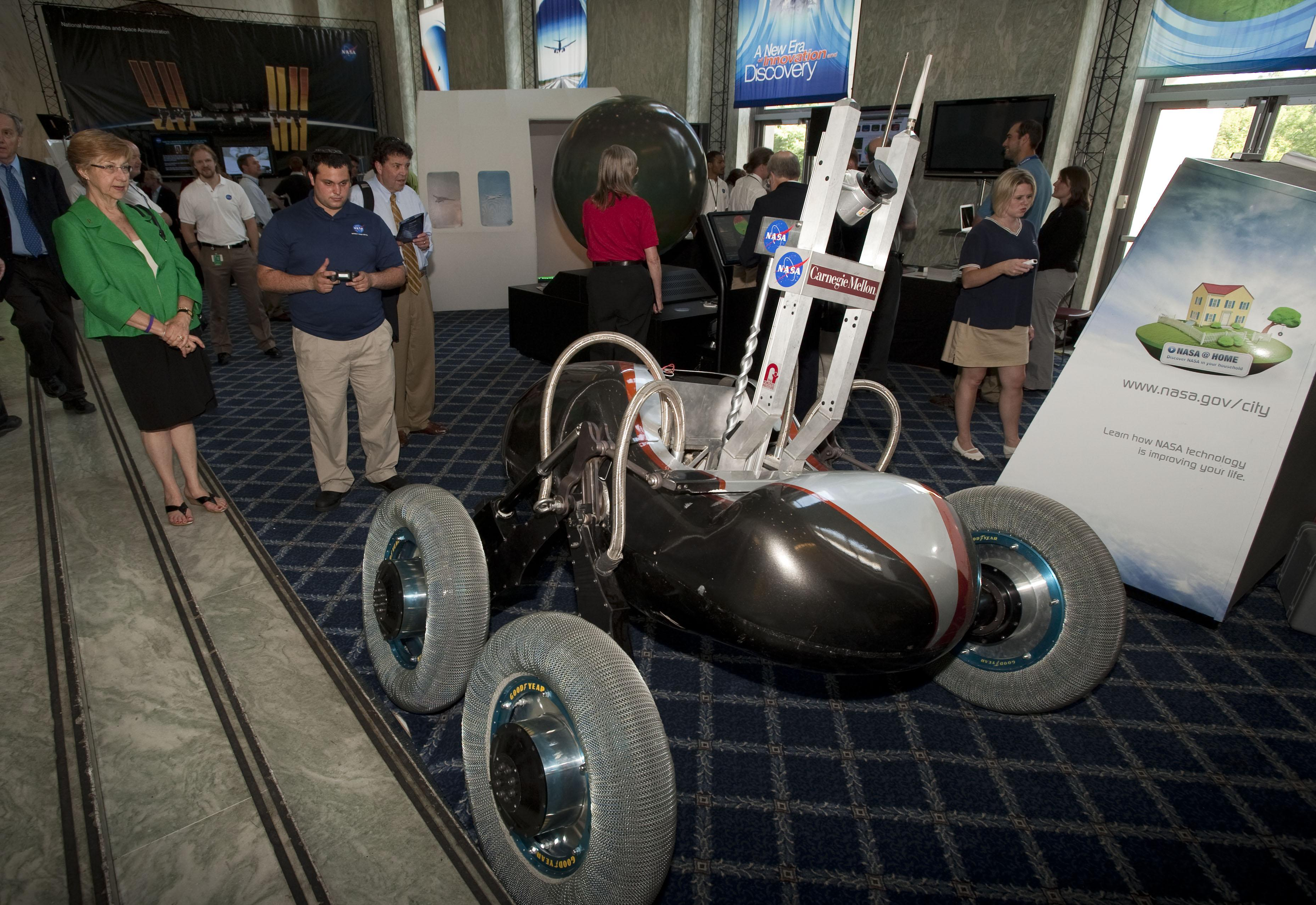
Scarab

Scarab is a 2010 robotic lunar rover prototype designed to assist astronauts take rock and mineral samples. Scarab is capable of autonomously traversing in dark polar craters using laser mapping to navigate and carries a science payload. The science payload is capable of taking a core sample from 1 m depth and analyzing it for water and gasses, and also has an 80 cm bucket wheel for collecting lunar samples. The rover has a mass of 312 kg. Scarab will also be used to test varying mobility techniques and lunar wheels. It is being developed by the Robotics Institute of Carnegie Mellon University, with support by NASA.

== See also ==
- LORAX (robot)
- TriDAR
- Robotic exploration of the Moon
- Lunar rover
