= Lee Gutkind =

American writer

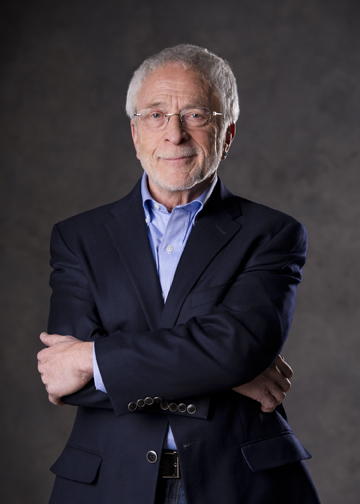
- Born: January 3, 1943 (age 83)
- Education: University of Pittsburgh
- Occupation: Writer
- Spouse: Patricia Park (divorced)
- Children: Sam Gutkind
- Writing career
- Language: English
- Genre: Creative nonfiction
- Website: leegutkind.com

Lee Gutkind is an American writer, speaker, and founder of the literary journal called Creative Nonfiction.

Gutkind has written or edited more than 30 books, covering a wide range of subjects from motorcycle subculture to child and adolescent mental illness and organ transplantation.

Currently he is Distinguished Writer in Residence at the Consortium for Science Policy and Outcomes and Professor at the School of Life Sciences at Arizona State University.

== Early life ==
Gutkind was born on January 3, 1943, in Pittsburgh, Pennsylvania to Jewish parents, Mollie Osgood and a shoe salesman father. He had his Bar Mitzvah at Shaare Torah Congregation, an Orthodox congregation in Pittsburgh.

He earned his bachelor's degree in English from the University of Pittsburgh in 1968. After high school and service in the United States Coast Guard, he held jobs as a truck driver, traveling shoe salesman and public relations account executive.

== Career ==
In 1973, he published his first book, Bike Fever: On Motorcycle Culture. He then joined the University of Pittsburgh's Department of English faculty, where he eventually became the first tenured professor at the university without an advanced degree.

Gutkind founded the literary journal Creative Nonfiction in 1993. He also published three issues of Best Creative Nonfiction, an anthology of creative nonfiction. At Arizona State University, he founded the ThinkWritePublish program, supported by The National Science Foundation (Science in Society) and the Templeton Foundation (True Stories About Science and Religion).

Gutkind has lectured about nonfiction to a wide range audiences and organizations, including the National Academy of Science, Earth Justice, the Institute for Learning, the Council on Healthcare Economics and Policy at Princeton University, as well as foreign audiences. He delivered a writing seminar at Bar-Ilan University in Israel.

He helped found the first MFA program in creative nonfiction at the University of Pittsburgh. He also helped found the first low-residency MFA program in creative nonfiction at Goucher College, and for 11 years was director of the Mid-Atlantic Creative Nonfiction Writers' Conference there. He was the director and founder of the "412 Pittsburgh Creative Nonfiction Literary Festival" for four years. He also served as the Virginia G. Piper Distinguished Writer in Residence at Arizona State University in 2007-2008.

== Awards and recognition ==
Lee Gutkind's list of honorary achievements include

: The Steve Allan Individual Award, by United Mental Health, Inc; Chancellor's Award for Public Service; Meritorious Service Award by American Council on Transplantation; Howard Blakeslee Award by the American Heart Association for "outstanding journalism; Golden Eagle Award by CINE, for the film A Place Just Right; Recipient of National Endowment of the Arts Creative Writing Fellowship. In 2004, Gutkind was awarded an Honorary Doctorate of Letters from Chatham College.

In a 1997 snipe at Gutkind in the print edition, Vanity Fair called Gutkind "the Godfather" of the genre of creative nonfiction. More than 10 years later, Harper's Magazine was quoted as having stated he was "the leading figure behind the creative nonfiction movement."

== List of publications ==
=== Written ===
Title	Description	Publisher	Year	ISBN
You Can't Make This Stuff Up	A writer's guide to reading & writing creative nonfiction.	Da Capo Lifelong Books	2012	ISBN 978-0-7382-1554-9
An Immense New Power to Heal: The Promise of Personalized Medicine	Co-authored with Pagan Kennedy, this book delves into the personal side of medicine, offering the physician's perspective and the patient's experience through intimate narratives and case studies.	In Fact Books	2012	ISBN 978-1937163068
Truckin' with Sam	A memoir chronicling several years of Gutkind's experiences traveling across the United States and the world with his son Sam, who appears later in the book as a co-author.	State University of New York Press	2010	ISBN 978-1-4384-3259-5
Almost Human: Making Robots Think	Documents four years of observation at the Carnegie-Mellon University Robotics Institute, as they imagine, design, build, and test robots. Some scenes also take place at NASA and in the Atacama Desert in Chile.	W. W. Norton	2007	ISBN 978-0-393-05867-3
Forever Fat: Essays by the Godfather	A memoir.	University of Nebraska Press	2004	ISBN 0-8032-2194-0
The Best Seat in Baseball, But You Have to Stand: The Game as Umpires See It	A reprint of the original 1973 book from Dial Press.	University of Southern Illinois Press	1999	ISBN 978-0-8093-2195-7
The Veterinarian's Touch: Profiles of Life Among the Animals	Various profiles of veterinarians.	Owl Books	1998	ISBN 978-0-8050-5811-6
The Art of Creative Nonfiction: The Literature of Reality	A writer's guide to the craft of creative nonfiction.	John Wiley & Sons	1996	ISBN 0-471-11356-5
Creative Nonfiction: How to Live it and Write It	A guide to teach young writers how to use creative nonfiction	Chicago Review Press	1996	ISBN 1-55652-266-5
Stuck in Time: The Tragedy of Childhood Mental Illness	An examination of the American health care system.	Henry Holt and Company	1994	ISBN 0-8050-1469-1
One Children's Place: Inside a Children's Hospital	An examination of the American health care system.	A Plume Book by Penguin	1992	ISBN 978-0-452-26687-2
Many Sleepless Nights: The World of Organ Transplantation	An inside look at the world of organ transplantation.	W. W. Norton & Co.	1990	ISBN 978-0-8229-5905-2
The People of Penn's Woods West	Essays about rural America.	University of Pittsburgh Press	1984	ISBN 978-0-8229-5360-9
God's Helicopter	A novel.	Slow Loris Press	1983	ISBN 978-0-941038-09-6
The Best Seat in Baseball, But You Have to Stand: The Game As Umpires See It	An inside look at the life of major league umpires.	Dial Press	1975	ISBN 978-0-8093-2195-7
Bike Fever: An Examination of the Motorcycle Subculture	Lee's first book.	Avon Books, Inc.	1973	ISBN 978-0-695-80380-3

=== Edited ===
Title	Description	Publisher	Year	ISBN
Show Me All Your Scars: True Stories of Living With Mental Illness	Introduction by Patrick J. Kennedy, and foreword by Dr. Karen Wolk Feinstein.	In Fact Books	2016	ISBN 978-1937163259
What I Didn't Know: True Stories of Becoming a Teacher	In these twenty personal narratives, teachers provide us with a fascinating insight into a profession that touches us all.	In Fact Books	2016	ISBN 978-1937163273
Same Time Next Week: True Stories of Working Through Mental Illness	These dramatic narratives communicate clearly the rewards of helping patients move forward with their lives, often through a combination of medication, talk therapy, and common sense. Collectively, these true stories highlight the need for empathy and compassion.	In Fact Books	2015	ISBN 978-1937163198
Oh, Baby: True Stories About Conception, Adoption, Surrogacy, Pregnancy, Labor, and Love	Co-edited with Alice Bradley. Introduction by Lisa Belkin.	In Fact Books	2015	ISBN 978-1937163211
The Rightful Place of Science: Creative Nonfiction	Contributing authors: Michael Zirulnik; Lee Gutkind; David Guston; Elizabeth Popp Berman; Adam Briggle; Roberta Chevrette; Gwen Ottinger; Angela Records; Meera Lee Sethi; Sara Wehlchel; Rachel Zurer; Ross Carper; Sonja Schmid	Consortium for Science, Policy, & Outcomes	2015	ASIN B01FGPKIO6
For the Love of Baseball: A Celebration of the Game That Connects Us All	Co-edited by Andrew Blauner. Introduction by Yogi Berra. United by the authors' fervent love of the game, each chapter in this book reminds us of the unique role baseball plays in our national history and collective imagination.	Skyhorse Publishing	2014	ISBN 978-1510702738
Southern Sin: True Stories of the Sultry South and Women Behaving Badly	Co-edited with Beth Ann Fennelly. Introduction by Dorothy Allison.	In Fact Books	2014	ISBN 978-1937163105
True Stories Well Told: From the First 20 Years of Creative Nonfiction Magazine	Co-edited with Hattie Fletcher. Introduction by Susan Orlean.	In Fact Books	2014	ISBN 978-1937163167
Writing Away the Stigma: Ten Courageous Writers Tell True Stories About Depression, Bipolar Disorder, ADHD, OCD, PTSD and More	In this collection, ten writers confront the stigma of mental illness head-on, bravely telling stories of devastating depressions, persistent traumas, overwhelming compulsions, and more.	In Fact Books	2014	ISBN 978-0692221297
Creating Nonfiction: Lessons From the Voice of the Genre	Co-edited with Robyn Jodlowski. Contributing authors: Roy Peter Clark, Megan Foss, Steven Harvey, Lisa Knopp, Bret Lott, Hilary Masters, Susan Messer, Natalia Rachel Singer	In Fact Books	2013	ASIN B00F0RWY7U
I Wasn't Strong Like This When I Started Out: True Stories of Becoming a Nurse	True stories of becoming a nurse.	In Fact Books	2013	ISBN 978-1937163129
True crime: Real-life Stories of Abduction, Addiction, Obsession, Murder, Grave-robbing, and More		In Fact Books	2013	ISBN 978-1937163143
Great Baseball Stories: Essays, Ruminations, and Nostalgic Reminiscences on Our National Pastime	Co-edited with Andrew Blauner, with foreword by Yogi Berra.	Skyhorse Publishing	2012	ISBN 978-1616086039
At the End of Life: True Stories About How We Die	Foreword by Francine Prose.	In Fact Books	2012	ISBN 978-1937163044
Becoming a Doctor: From Student to Specialist, Doctor-Writers Share Their Experiences.	Personal narratives from those who have gone through the process of becoming a doctor.	W.W. Norton & Co.	2011	ISBN 978-0393334555
Twelve Breaths a Minute: End of Life Essays	Twenty-three original, personal narratives that examine the way we as a society care for the dying.	Southern Methodist University Press	2011	ISBN 978-0-87074-571-3
Becoming a Doctor: From Student to Specialist, Doctor-Writers Share Their Experiences	(CNF description) Physicians recount personal stories from their lives in white coats in this inspired anthology by new and known writers. These original stories reveal the inner lives of the men and women who are often rendered invisible by their white coats.	W.W. Norton	2010	ISBN 978-0-393-33455-5
The Best Creative Nonfiction, Vol. 3	A third special issue of Creative Nonfiction that features twenty-five essays that originally appeared in alternative publications, blogs, literary journals, and other publications.	W.W. Norton	2009	ISBN 978-0-393-33025-0
The Best Creative Nonfiction, Vol. 2	A second special issue of Creative Nonfiction that features twenty-nine essays that originally appeared in alternative publications, blogs, literary journals, and other publications.	W.W. Norton	2008	ISBN 978-0-393-33024-3
Anatomy of Baseball	Twenty new and classic essays about the American past time.	SMU Press	2008	ISBN 978-0-87074-522-5
Keep It Real: Everything You Need to Know About Researching and Writing Creative Nonfiction	Provides writers with the working parameters of the creative nonfiction genre	W.W. Norton	2008	ISBN 978-0-393-06561-9
Silence Kills: Speaking Out and Saving Lives	Twelve new essays written by physicians, patients, and family members. Explores the communication breakdown in the current American health care system	SMU Press	2007	ISBN 978-0-87074-518-8
The Best Creative Nonfiction, Vol. 1	A special issue of Creative Nonfiction that features twenty-seven essays that originally appeared in alternative publications, blogs, literary journals, and other publications.	W.W. Norton	2007	ISBN 978-0-393-33003-8
Hurricanes and Carnivals: Essays by Chicanos, Pochos, Pachucos, Mexicanos, and Expatriates	Originally published as Issue 23 of Creative Nonfiction, this book features fifteen essays that push the boundaries between fact and fiction.	The University of Arizona Press	2007	ISBN 978-0-8165-2625-3
Our Roots are Deep with Passion: `Creative Nonfiction` Collects New Essays by Italian American Writers	Twenty-one essays written by established and emerging writers that explore the unique intersections of language, tradition, cuisine, and culture that characterize the diverse experience of Americans of Italian heritage.	Other Press	2006	ISBN 978-1-59051-242-5
Rage & Reconciliation: Inspiring a Health Care Revolution	Originally published as issue 21 of Creative Nonfiction, the book includes new essays and an 80- minute CD containing three essays read by professional actors and a panel discussion of the ethical dimensions of the issues raised. Produced in conjunction with Pittsburgh's Jewish Healthcare Foundation, writers tackle health care in America, including problems of patient rights and professional responsibility.	SMU Press	2005	ISBN 0-87074-503-4
In Fact: The Best of Creative Nonfiction	Twenty-five essays, all originally appearing in Creative Nonfiction, republished in honor of the journal's tenth anniversary.	W.W. Norton	2005	ISBN 0-393-32665-9
On Nature: Great Writers on the Great Outdoors	Twenty original and previously published essays	Jeremy P. Tarcher	2002	ISBN 1-58542-173-1
Healing: 20 Prominent Authors Write About Inspirational Moments of Achieving Health and Gaining Insight	Twenty original and previously published essays	Jeremy P. Tarcher	2001	ISBN 1-58542-079-4
Lessons in Persuasion: Creative Nonfiction/Pittsburgh Connections	Eighteen essays written by writers with ties to the city of Pittsburgh.	University of Pittsburgh Press	2000	ISBN 0-8229-5715-9
Connecting: Twenty Prominent Authors Write About the Relationships That Shape Our Lives	Twenty original and previously published essays	Jeremy P. Tarcher/Putnam	1998	ISBN 0-87477-904-9
A View from the Divide: Creative Nonfiction on Health and Science	Seventeen essays that attempt to demonstrate the many ways in which aspects of the scientific world—from biology, medicine, physics, and astronomy—can be captured and dramatized for a humanities-oriented readership.	University of Pittsburgh Press	1998	ISBN 978-0-8229-5685-3
