= BionicKangaroo =

Biomimetic robot

BionicKangaroo is a robot model developed and made by Festo in the form of a kangaroo. Applying methods from kinematics, bionics, and biomimetics, Festo's researchers and engineers studied the way kangaroos move, and applied that to the design of a robot that moves in a similar way. The robot saves energy from each jump and applies it to its next jump, much as a real kangaroo does.

== See also ==
- Outline of robotics#Robots
