= God's Helicopter =

1983 novel by Lee Gutkind

- First edition
- Author: Lee Gutkind
- Cover artist: Frederick H. Carlson
- Language: English
- Genre: Novel
- Publisher: Slow Loris Press
- Publication date: 1983
- Publication place: United States
- Media type: Print (hardback)
- Pages: 175 pp
- ISBN: 0-9183-6626-7
- OCLC: 9081472
- Dewey Decimal: 813/.54 19
- LC Class: PS3557.U88 G6 1983

God's Helicopter is a young-adult novel by the American writer Lee Gutkind.

It is set in 1950s Pittsburgh, Pennsylvania when Dwight Eisenhower was president, Ralph Kiner was the left fielder for the Pittsburgh Pirates and the greatest man to ever live, according to the twelve-year-old Willie Heinemann, protagonist of this novel. His friend Ronald Middlebaum, however, fights a life-threatening illness and Willie seeks to understand a God who wants Middlebaum dead.
