= List of robotics occupations =

Occupations in robotics and automation

This is a list of robotics occupations which are occupations involved in research and development, engineering design, computer programming, systems integration, testing, manufacturing, integration, and maintenance of robots and robotic systems.

== Engineering and design ==
- Algorithm engineer
- Automation engineer
- Artificial intelligence engineer
- Computer engineer
- Control engineer
- Design engineer
- Electrical engineer
- Electronics engineer
- Mechanical engineer
- Mechatronics engineer
- Robotics engineer
- Software engineer
- Systems engineer

== Software and autonomy ==
- Computer vision engineer
- Embedded systems engineer
- Machine learning engineer
- Robot programmer

== Integration and testing ==
- Industrial engineer
- Systems integrator

== Manufacturing and fabrication ==
- CNC machinist
- Machinist
- Manufacturing engineer

== Technicians and maintenance ==
- Electronics technician
- Robotics technician
- PLC technician

== Research and human–robot interaction ==
- Human factors engineer
- Research engineer
- Research scientist

== See also ==
- List of engineering branches
- List of open-source software for robotics
- List of open-source robotics projects
- List of roboticists
- List of robotics companies
- List of robotics journals
- List of robots
- Lists of open-source artificial intelligence software
- Lists of occupations
- Outline of computer vision
- Outline of robotics
- Types of robots
