= AISoy1 =

Emotional-learning pet-robot

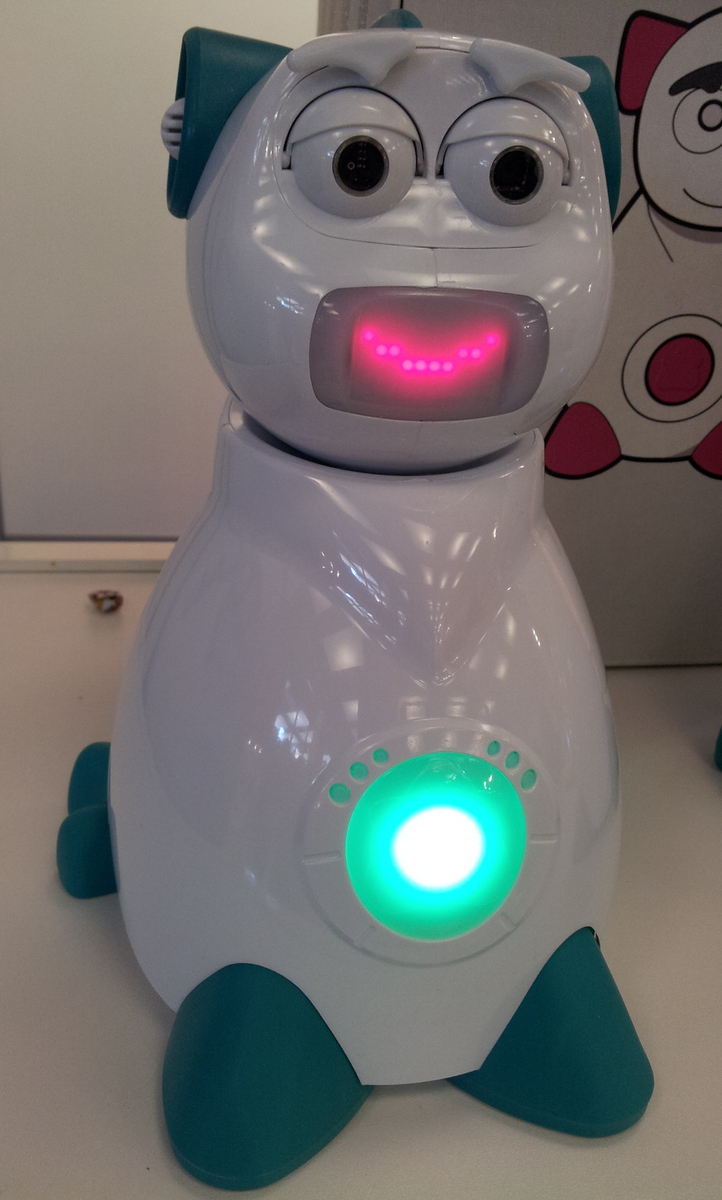
AISoy1 robot

AISoy1, developed by the Spanish company AISoy Robotics, is a pet-robot considered to be one of the first emotional-learning robots for the consumer market. Its software platform allows it to interpret stimuli from its sensors network, in order to gain information from its environment and take decisions based on logical and emotional criteria. Unlike other previously developed robots, AISoy1 has not a single collection of programmed answers, but its behavior is dynamic and results unpredictable. The dialogue system and the advanced recognition system allow it to interact with humans as well as robots.

== Features ==
The robot is based on the Linux operating system with a Texas Instruments OMAP 3503 (ARM Cortex A8) processor at 600 MHz. It has a 1 GB NAND FLASH memory, 256 MB MOBILE DDR SDRAM, and a microSD card slot to increase its memory.

AISoy1 has various sensors, including temperature, 3D orientation, environmental brightness, touch and force sensors. It is equipped with a radio communication module as well as an integrated 1Mpx camera, allowing it to visually recognize users.

== Human Interaction ==
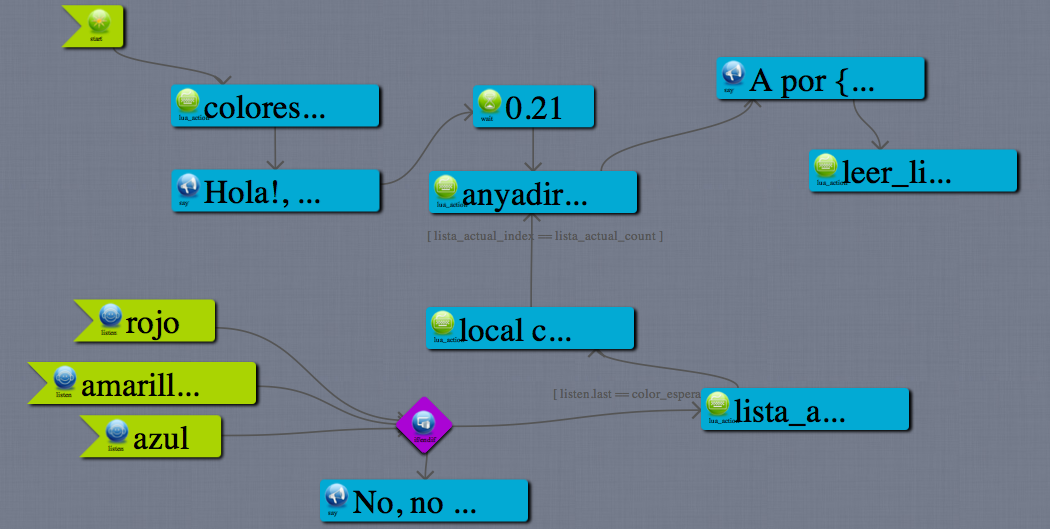
Graphical Programming Interface DIA

The AISoy1 robots develop a unique personality based on their past experiences with the user. As they develop a relationship with their user, they improve their speech ability and feeling capacities. They are able to display up to 14 different emotional states.

AISoy1 can be commanded to perform different activities through voice commands, such as engaging in games, playing music, or saving information. Users wanting to extend the functionality of AISoy1 can do so through the platform DIA, which allows quick creation of programs through a graphical tool. More advanced users can integrate hardware and develop complex programs through the SDK from AISoy.
