= Xiaoyi (robot) =

AI-powered robotic medical doctor

- Manufacturer: iFlyTek Co., Ltd
- Country: China
- Type: medical robot
- Purpose: Health care

Xiaoyi is a Chinese artificial intelligence system developed by iFlytek in collaboration with Tsinghua University to assist with medical diagnosis. In 2017, Xiaoyi became the first AI system reported to pass the written component of China's national medical licensing examination, scoring 456 out of 600 points.

== Overview ==
The name Xiaoyi means "Little Doctor". The system was developed by iFlytek and Tsinghua University as part of their research into artificial intelligence applications in healthcare.

According to The Beijing News, Xiaoyi initially scored approximately 100 out of 600 points in a practice examination, below the passing threshold of 360. The system was subsequently trained using material from medical textbooks, approximately two million medical records and 400,000 articles. In August 2017, Xiaoyi completed the written examination under supervised conditions and received a score of 456, exceeding the passing threshold by 96 points.

The developers intended Xiaoyi to assist doctors by analysing patient information and supporting clinical diagnosis. In 2017, iFlytek announced plans to introduce Xiaoyi for clinical assistance in March 2018, rather than as a replacement for medical practitioners.
