= Robop =

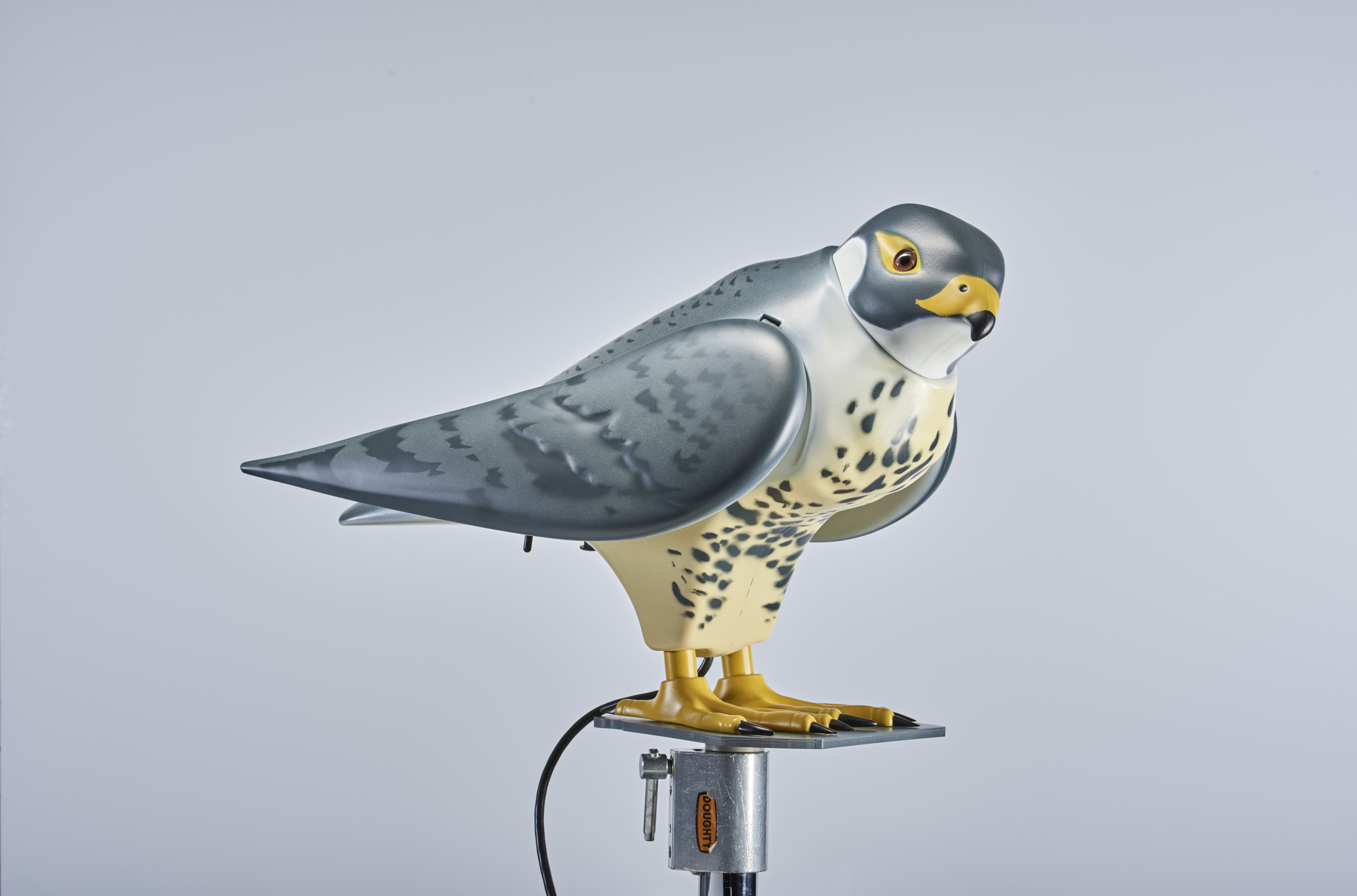
Robop Limited's R:Falcon Bird Deterrent

"Robop" is short for robotic bird of prey. The business, Robop Ltd. is the creator of the innovative R:Falcon mechanical bird control deterrent - based on the peregrine falcon. The falcon is the natural predator of most species of pest birds that predominantly cause bird problems. The R:Falcon could be considered both a sound and visual deterrent, the device flaps its wings, moves its head, and makes the call of a real live peregrine falcon.
