= Underactuation =

Technical term in robot control theory

Underactuation is a technical term used in robotics and control theory to describe mechanical systems that cannot be commanded to follow arbitrary trajectories in configuration space. This condition can occur for a number of reasons, the simplest of which is when the system has a lower number of actuators than degrees of freedom. In this case, the system is said to be trivially underactuated.

The class of underactuated mechanical systems includes automobiles, airplanes, and animals.

== Definition ==
To understand the mathematical conditions which lead to underactuation, one must examine the dynamics that govern the systems in question. Newton's laws of motion dictate that the dynamics of mechanical systems are inherently second order. In general, these dynamics can be described by a second order differential equation:

$\ddot{q} = f(q,\dot{q},u,t)$

Where:

$q \in \mathbb{R}^n$ is the position state vector
$u \in \mathbb{R}^m$ is the vector of control inputs
$t$ is time.

Furthermore, in many cases the dynamics for these systems can be rewritten to be affine in the control inputs:

$\ddot{q} = f_1(q,\dot{q},t) + f_2(q, \dot{q}, t)u$

When expressed in this form, the system is said to be underactuated if:

$rank[{f_2(q, \dot{q}, t)}] < dim[q]$

When this condition is met, there are acceleration directions that can not be produced no matter what the control vector is.

Note that $f_2(q, \dot{q}, t)$ does not explicitly represent the number of actuators present in the system. Indeed, there may be more actuators than degrees of freedom and the system may still be underactuated. Also worth noting is the dependence of $f_2(q, \dot{q}, t)$ on the state $q, \dot{q}$. That is, there may exist states in which an otherwise fully actuated system becomes underactuated.

== Examples ==
The classic inverted pendulum is an example of a trivially underactuated system: it has two degrees of freedom (one for its support's motion in the horizontal plane, and one for the angular motion of the pendulum), but only one of them (the cart position) is actuated, and the other is only indirectly controlled. Although naturally extremely unstable, this underactuated system is still controllable.

A standard automobile is underactuated due to the nonholonomic constraints imposed by the wheels. That is, a car cannot accelerate in a direction perpendicular to the direction the wheels are facing. A similar argument can be made for boats, planes and most other vehicles.

== See also ==
- Passive dynamics
