= LORAX =

The Life On ice: Robotic Antarctic eXplorer or LORAX was an experimental robotics project developed by the Robotics Institute of Carnegie Mellon University, and supported by NASA. The intent of the project was to create an autonomous rover to survey the distribution of microbes on Antarctica's ice sheets. It is unknown whether it intentionally shared a name with The Lorax, the environmentalist Dr. Seuss character.

The goal was to create a robotic platform with full navigational autonomy and clean, sustainable power systems. This complete isolation would've allowed the robot to operate unattended and avoid any possible contamination of its results. The project aimed for the robot to be able to operate for one month without human intervention. The rover's power systems incorporated a combination of solar power and wind power. Several solar panels were mounted on the shell of the rover. It also had a deployable wind turbine for generating further power.

A working model of the LORAX rover called Nomad was tested in 2005 on the frozen Mascoma Lake in New Hampshire. The rover completed a ten kilometer test run, traversed ice obstacles and conducted a successful test of its wind turbine. The rover, independent of any human guidance, traveled over fourteen kilometers in all on the frozen lake and returned to its starting point. The test also yielded further calibrations to many of the rover's systems.

== See also ==
- Scarab (rover)
