= Zoë (robot) =

Solar-powered autonomous robot

Zoë is a solar-powered autonomous robot with sensors able to detect microorganisms and map the distribution of life in the Atacama Desert of northern Chile, duplicating tasks that could be used in future exploration of Mars. Zoë is equipped with tools and sensors to search for direct evidence of life beneath the surface of the ground. Zoë significantly aids in research needed to study Mars because it acts as a mobile observer and analyzer of any signs of life in a given location. It collects primary data which will help in understanding conditions present on Mars. This project will verify reliability of autonomous, mobile, and scientifically made robots.

== Specifications ==
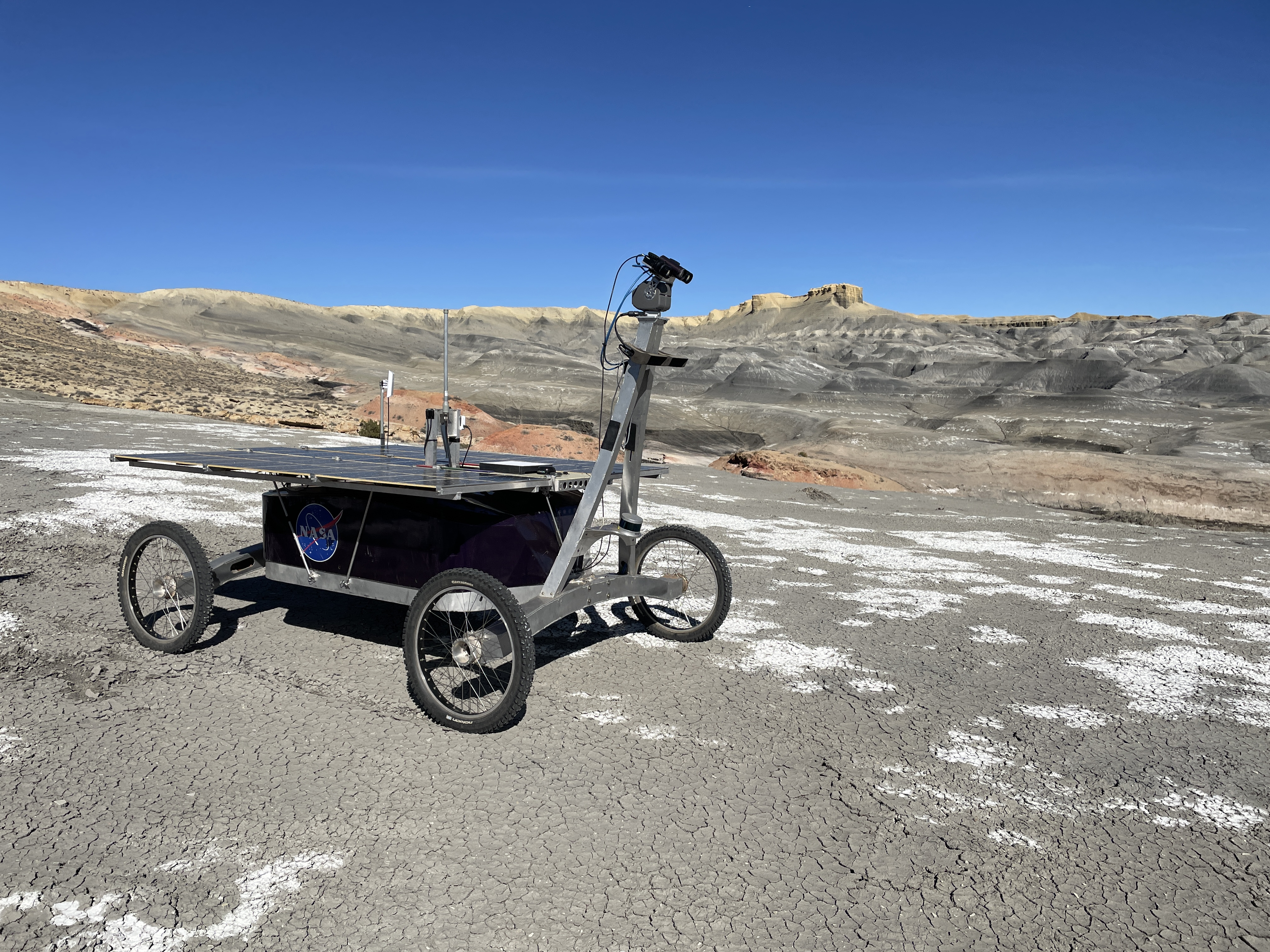
Zoë rover in the Arizona desert (2021) undergoing field tests of its science autonomy system which uses onboard algorithms and instruments to create geologic maps

Zoë is a four-wheeled 220 kg rover with dimensions of approximately 2.9 m in length, 2.9 m in width, and a height of 2 m. It achieves a top speed of 1 m/s with a turning radius of 2.5 m Zoë carries a 3.5 m2 Solar Panel with a maximum power generation of 1600 W which allows it to move, activate computers and sensors, and charges the batteries.

== Tools and Sensors ==
Zoë carries a one-meter long drill on its back. The drill will collect soil samples underground which will then be analyzed by other tools on board. This drill is able to collect soil samples underground with a maximum depth of 80 cm below surface. Zoë carries the Mars Microbeam Raman Spectrometer which is able to identify specific types of minerals in the subsurface. Other instruments include the Bio IV Fluorescence Imager which indicates the amount of natural fluorescence in soil and rocks, and detects chlorophyll-based-life; a sample carousel, which is used to store samples and used to deliver drill shavings to other instruments on-board; a colored-panoramic imager on a tilt unit, which captures high-resolution photographs up to 1mm/pixel resolution; a visible/near infrared Spectrometer, which transforms spectra to visible and near-infrared wavelengths; and includes environmental sensors which are able to detect weather conditions such as the temperature, humidity, wetness, and wind.

== Functionality ==
- Solar powered
- Sensors
- Avoids rocks and slopes
- Drives and steers

== Life in the Atacama Desert ==
Zoë was placed in the driest Desert on earth, the Atacama Desert, which is also considered to be the most lifeless. Research on this habitat did not truly begin until interest rose for NASA’s astrobiology program. With much similar aspects to Mars, the Atacama Desert was proven to be a proper imitation of Mars. With this realization, scientists and researchers are dedicating their time to examine every part of the desert in hopes of finding microbial life.

== Expeditions ==
In the fall of 2004, a team of scientists accompanied Zoë on a two-month expedition in the Atacama Desert so it wouldn’t “drive off a cliff” Zoë was placed in the Atacama Desert in 2005 for its first field expedition. During its time there, it was able to map out any living organisms. In 2013, Zoë returned to the Desert with a meter-long drill to produce research of any existing microbial life beneath the Desert’s surface.

== Team ==
- Carnegie Mellon Field Robotics Center
- Nasa Ames Research Center
- Nasa Jet Propulsion Lab
- The University of Tennessee Department of Geology
- Universidad Catolica del Norte
- Honeybee Robotics Spacecraft Mechanisms Corporation
- USGS
- Washington University in St. Louis
- Other: Raul Arias

== Sources ==
- Life in the Atacama
- Space.com
- NASA
- SETI Institute
- Carnegie Mellon University
