= Mechanical arm =

Machine that mimics the action of a human arm

A mechanical arm is a machine that usually mimics the action of a human arm. Mechanical arms are composed of multiple beams connected by hinges powered by actuators. One end of the arm is attached to a firm base while the other has a tool. They can be controlled by humans either directly or over a distance. A computer-controlled mechanical arm is called a robotic arm. However, a robotic arm is just one of many types of different mechanical arms.

Mechanical arms can be as simple as tweezers or as complex as prosthetic arms. In other words, if a mechanism can grab an object, hold an object, and transfer an object just like a human arm, it can be classified as a mechanical arm.

Recent advancements have been brought about to lead future improvements in the medical field with prosthetics and with the mechanical arm in general. When mechanical engineers build complex mechanical arms, the goal is for the arm to perform a task that ordinary human arms can not complete.

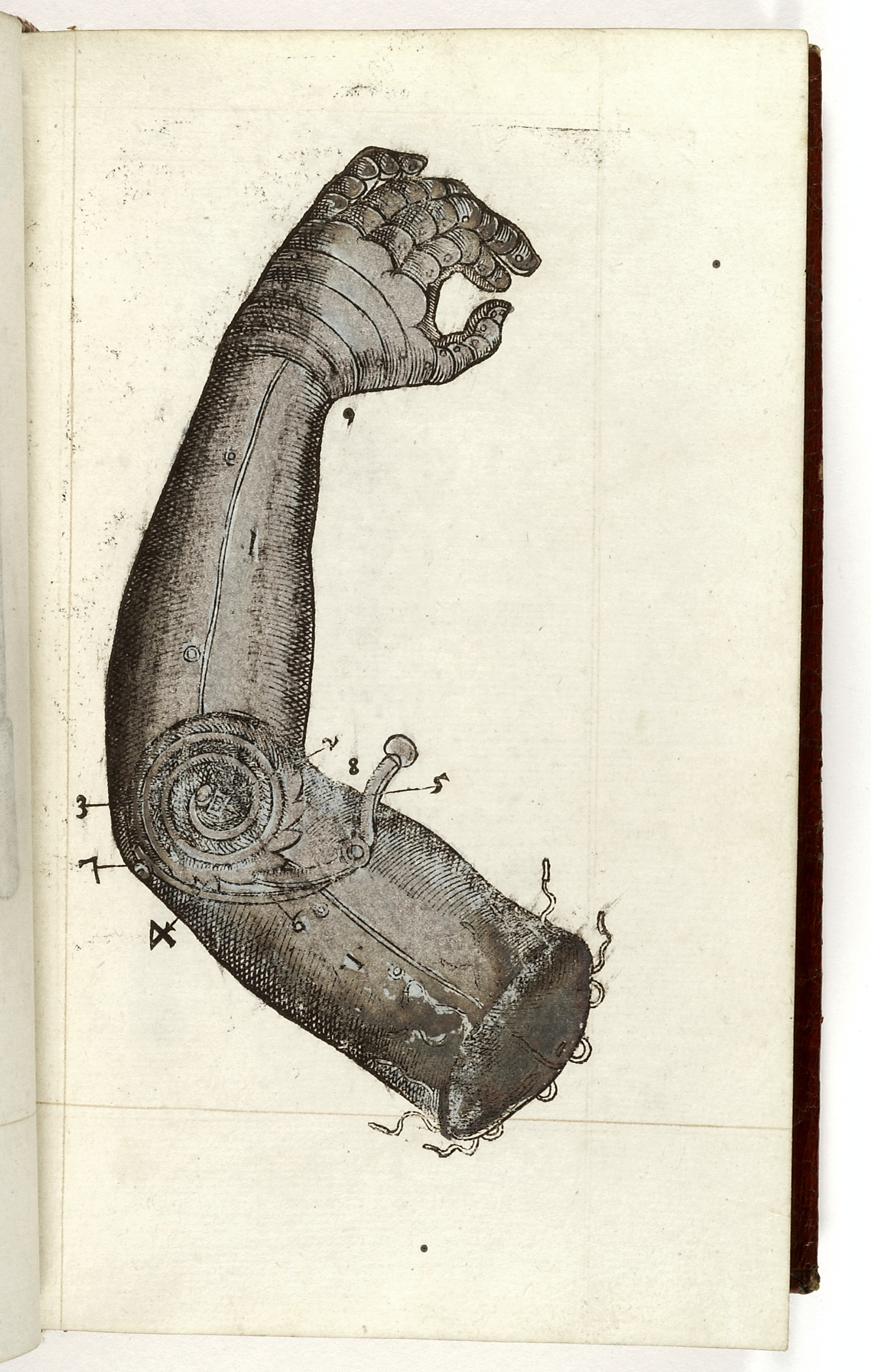
Ambroise Pare: prosthetics, mechanical arm (Published: 1564)

== History ==
=== Robotic Arms ===
Researchers have classified the robotic arm by its industrial applications, medical applications, and technology, etc. It was first introduced in the late 1930s by William Pollard and Harold A. Roseland, where they developed a "sprayer" that had about five degrees of freedom and an electric control system. Pollard's was called “first position controlling apparatus.” William Pollard never designed or built his arm, but it was a base for other inventors in the future.

In 1961 the Unimate was invented, evolving to the PUMA arm. In 1963, the Rancho arm was designed, along with many others in the future. Even though Joseph Engelberger marketed Unimate, George Devol invented the robotic arm. It focused on using Unimate for tasks harmful to humans. In 1959, a 2700-pound Unimate prototype was installed at the General Motors die-casting plant in Trenton, New Jersey. The Unimate 1900 series became the very first produced robotic arm for die-casting. During a very short period of time, had been produced at least 450 robotic arms which were being used. It still remains one of the most significant contributions in the last one hundred years. As years went by, technology evolved, helping to build better robotic arms. Not only did companies invent different robotic arms, but so did colleges. In 1969, Victor Scheinman from Stanford University invented the Stanford arm, where it had electronically powered arms that could move through six axes. Marvin Minsky, from MIT, built a robotic arm for the office of Naval Research, possibly for underwater explorations. This arm had twelve single degree freedom joints in this electric- hydraulic- high dexterity arm. Robots were initially created to perform a series of tasks that humans found boring, harmful, and tedious.

=== Prosthetics ===
==== Before the Modern Era ====
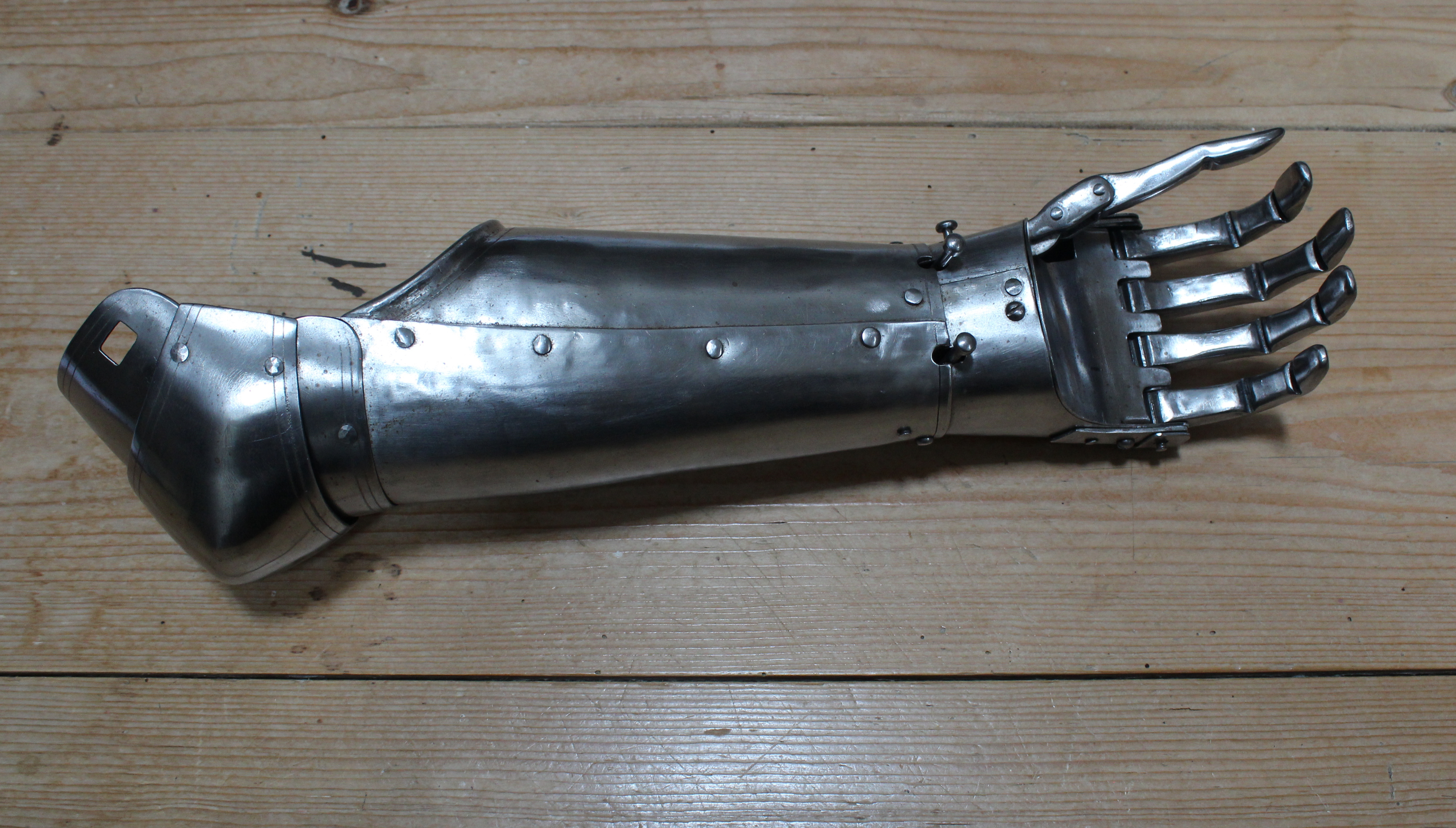
Replica of a prosthetic arm. The original probably dates from between 1550 and 1600.

The history of prosthetic limbs came to be by such great inventors. The world's first and earliest functioning prosthetic body parts are two toes from Ancient Egypt. Because of their unique functionality, these toes are an example of a true prosthetic device. These toes carry at least forty percent of the body's weight. Most prosthetic limbs would be produced after there is intensive studying of a human being's form by using modern equipment. Prosthetic limbs were used during the war too, including during the late 1480s. A German knight, who served with the Holy Roman Emperor Charles V, was injured during the war. Even though prosthetic limbs were expensive, this particular limb was manufactured by an armor specialist. Soldiers were allowed to continue their career because of prosthetics. The fingers could grasp a shield, hold reins to horses, and even a quill when drafting an important document.

==== Modern Era ====
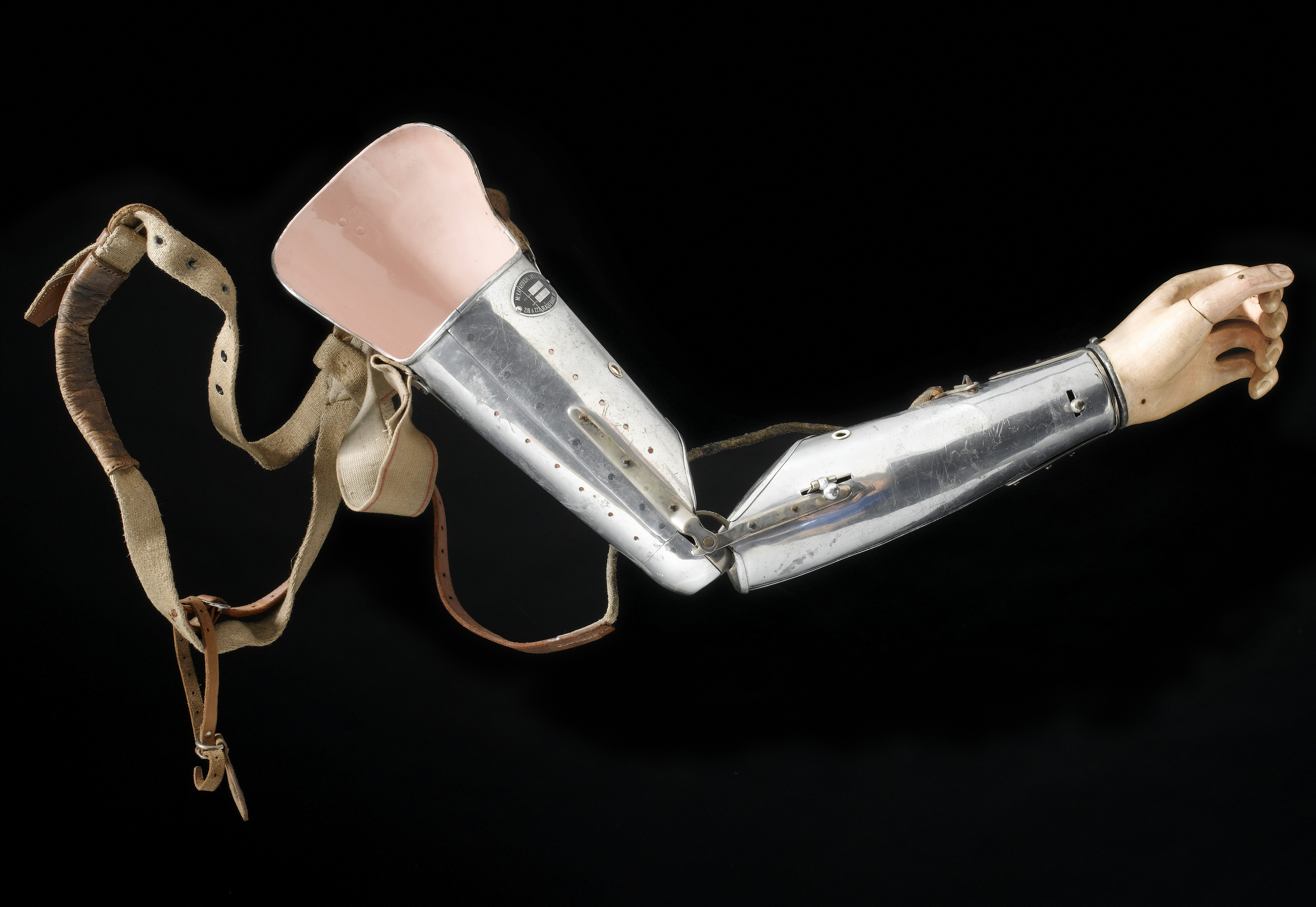
Artificial left arm, London, England Wellcome.

As time passed, limb design started to focus on people's specialties as well. For example, a pianist would need a different type of mechanical arm than others. Their limbs would be widespread and their middle and ring fingers would be smaller than normal. In addition, an arm design of padded tips on the thumb and little finger would allow a pianist to span a series of notes while playing their instrument.

Technology for the prosthetic limbs kept evolving after World War I. After the war, laborers would return to work, using either legs or the arms because of its ability to grip objects. This is one of the designs that remains unchanged over the past century. People with such prosthetics would do everyday things like driving a car, eating food, and much more.

=== Arms for Automotive Manufacturing ===
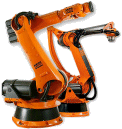
6 Axis Articulated Robots

Without the mechanical arm, the production of cars would be extremely difficult. This problem was first solved in 1962 when the first mechanical arm was used in a “General Motors” factory. Using this mechanical arm, also known as an industrial robot, engineers were able to achieve difficult welding tasks. In addition, the removal of die-castings was another important step in improving the abilities of a mechanical arm. With such technology, engineers were able to easily remove unneeded metal underneath mold cavities. Stemming off these uses, welding started to become increasingly popular for mechanical arms.

In 1979, the company Nachi refined the first motor-driven robot to perform spot welding. Spot welding is a very important process used in the creation of cars to join separate surfaces together. Soon enough, mechanical arms were being passed down to additional car companies.

As constant improvements were being made, the National University of Singapore (NUS) decided to make even further advancements by inventing a mechanical arm that can lift up to 80 times its original weight. Not only did this arm expand its lift strength, but the arm could also extend to five times its original length. These advancements were first introduced in 2012 and car companies can greatly benefit from this new scientific knowledge.

=== Surgical Arms ===
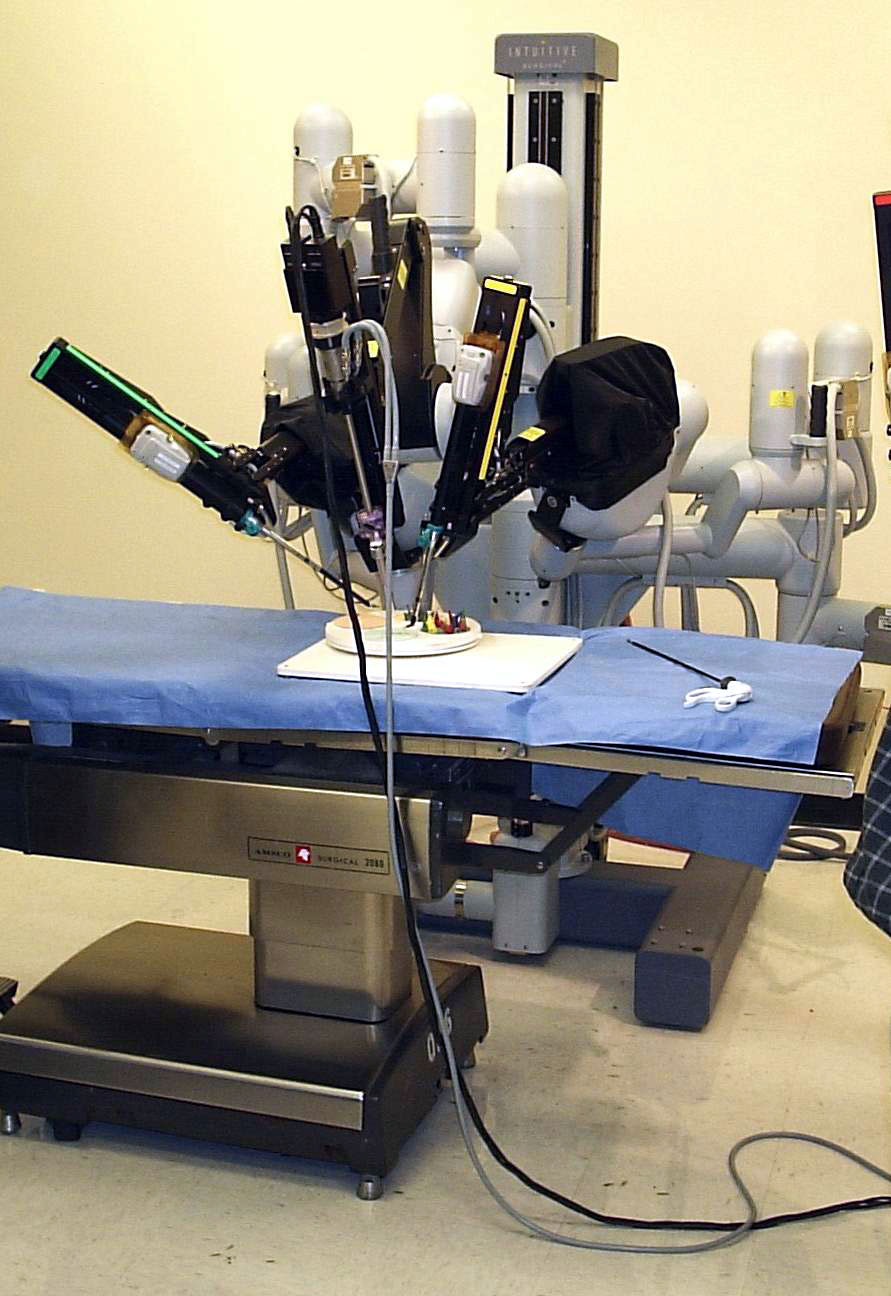
Laproscopic Surgery Robot (2006)

Surgical arms were first used in 1985 when a neurosurgical biopsy was performed. In 1990, the FDA allowed endoscopic surgical procedures to be done by the Automated Educational Substitute Operator (AESOP) system. This was not the only improvement the FDA made, however. While the AESOP system was more of a Computer Motion system, the first surgery system came about in 2000, when the da Vinci Surgical System became the first robotic surgery system approved by the FDA.

== Types ==
=== Prosthetic arms ===
Prosthetics may not seem like a mechanical arm, but they are. It uses hinges and a wire harness to allow an incapable being to perform everyday functions. They have started creating arms that take a structure of a human arm and even though it looks like a skeletal metal arm, it moves like a normal arm and hand. This arm was made by Johns Hopkins University in 2015. It has 26 joints (way more than the old outdated arms) and is capable of lifting up to 45 pounds. This arm has 100 sensors that connect to the human mind. These sensors allow the person with the arm to move the arm like it was just another part of his or her body. People who have used this new prosthetic can say that they have actually been able to feel the texture, ultimately making prosthetics a huge part of the mechanical arm category.

=== Rover arms ===
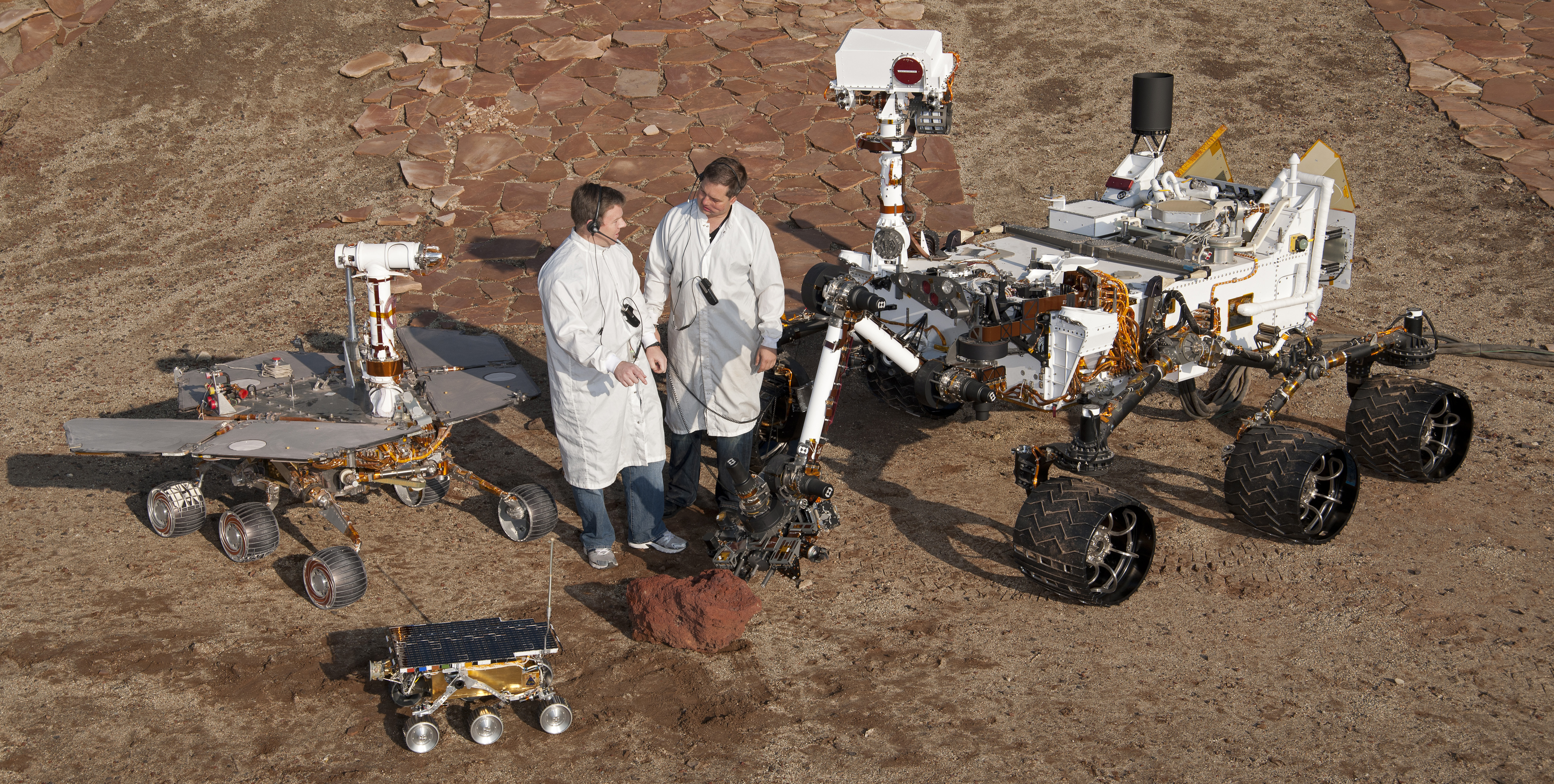
Three generations of Mars rovers

In space, NASA used a mechanical arm for new planetary discoveries. One of these discoveries came from sending a rover to another planet and collecting samples from this planet. With a rover, NASA can just keep the rover on its designated planet and explore all they want. Mechanical arms are also attached to the ships that are acting as satellite stations in Earth's atmosphere because they help grab debris that might cause damage to other satellites. Not only that, but they also keep astronauts safe when they have to go make a repair to the ship or satellite. Now, space isn't where all the rover's with mechanical arms are. Even the SWAT team and other special forces use these rovers to go into a building or unsafe area to defuse a bomb, plant a bomb or repair vehicles.

=== Everyday Mechanical Arms ===
Every day a person might be using a type of mechanical arm. Many mechanical arms are used for very ordinary things like being able to grab an out of reach object with the pincer mechanical arm. A simple system of 3 joints squeezes and releases motion causing the pincer to close and finally grab a desired object. Even the objects that might seem super simplistic like tweezers can be classified as a mechanical arm.

== Modifications and Advancements ==
=== Muscle Tissue for Mechanical Arms ===
The National University of Singapore is developing artificial muscle tissue to be used in mechanical arms to help assist in carrying heavy loads, able to support and lift up to 500 times its own weight. The more muscle built into the mechanical arm, the greater lifting strength the arm will have. Potential applications include construction and other areas requiring the transport of heavy loads, allowing individuals to safely carry what would otherwise require multiple people or heavier equipment.

=== Sensor Mechanical Arms ===
In the modern day, mechanical arms, with the help of a chip attached to one's spinal cord, allows a person to move the arm. Since sensors can be programmed to have a higher sensitivity to anything the sensor touches, people with prosthetic arms will also be able to feel the object they are touching.

=== Lifelike Mechanical Arms ===
Modern developments in mechanical arm engineering focus on expanding the capabilities of prosthetic devices and industrial equipment. Advanced designs are frequently developed to execute precise, repetitive, or high-load tasks that exceed human anatomical limitations.

== See also ==
- Robotic arm
- Excavator
- Articulated robot
- Mechanical Engineering
- Mars Curiosity Rover - Robotic Arm
- Leonardo da Vinci
