= Programmable Universal Machine for Assembly =

Industrial robotic arm developed by Unimation

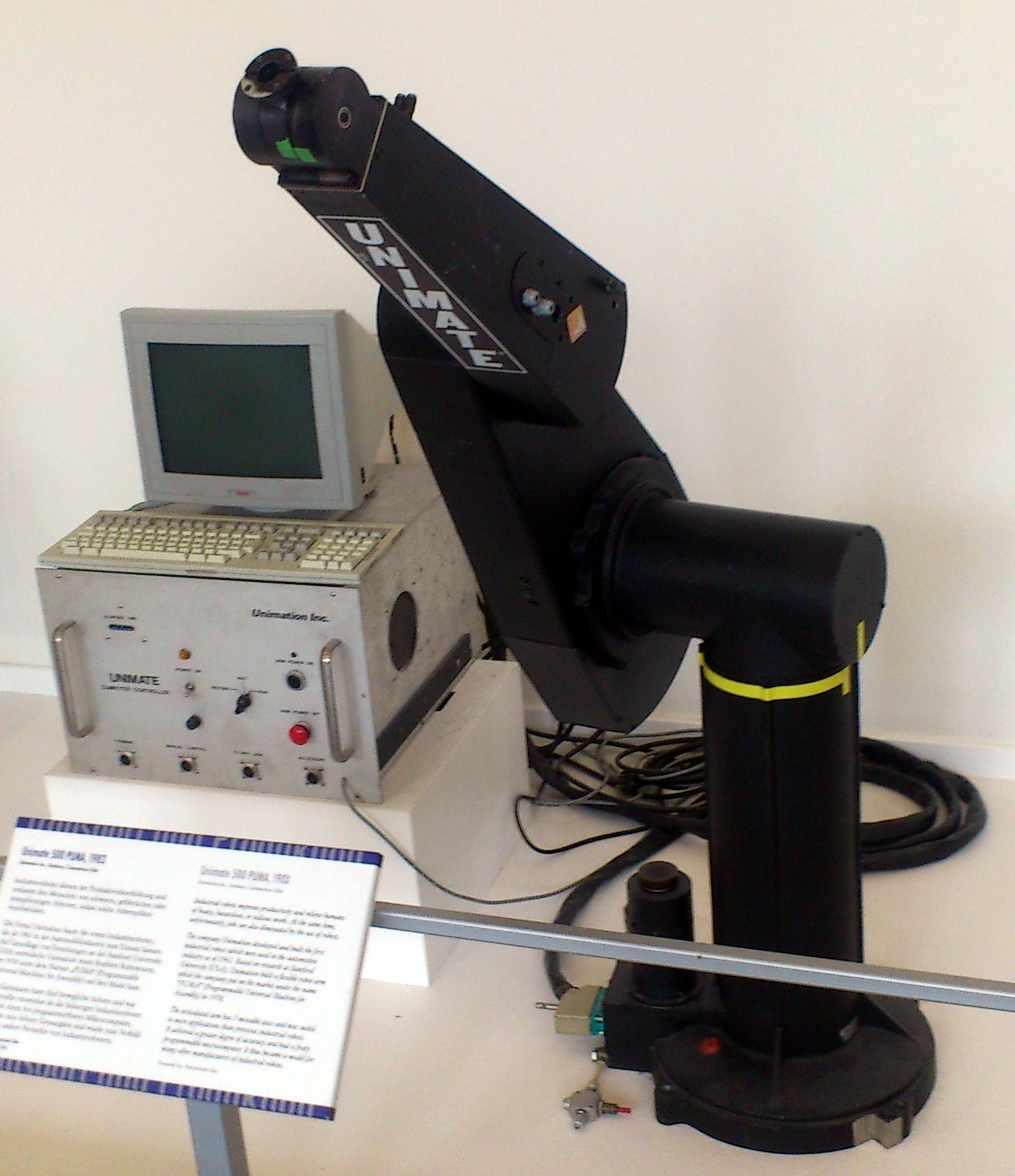
Unimate 500 PUMA (1983), control unit and computer terminal at Deutsches Museum, Munich

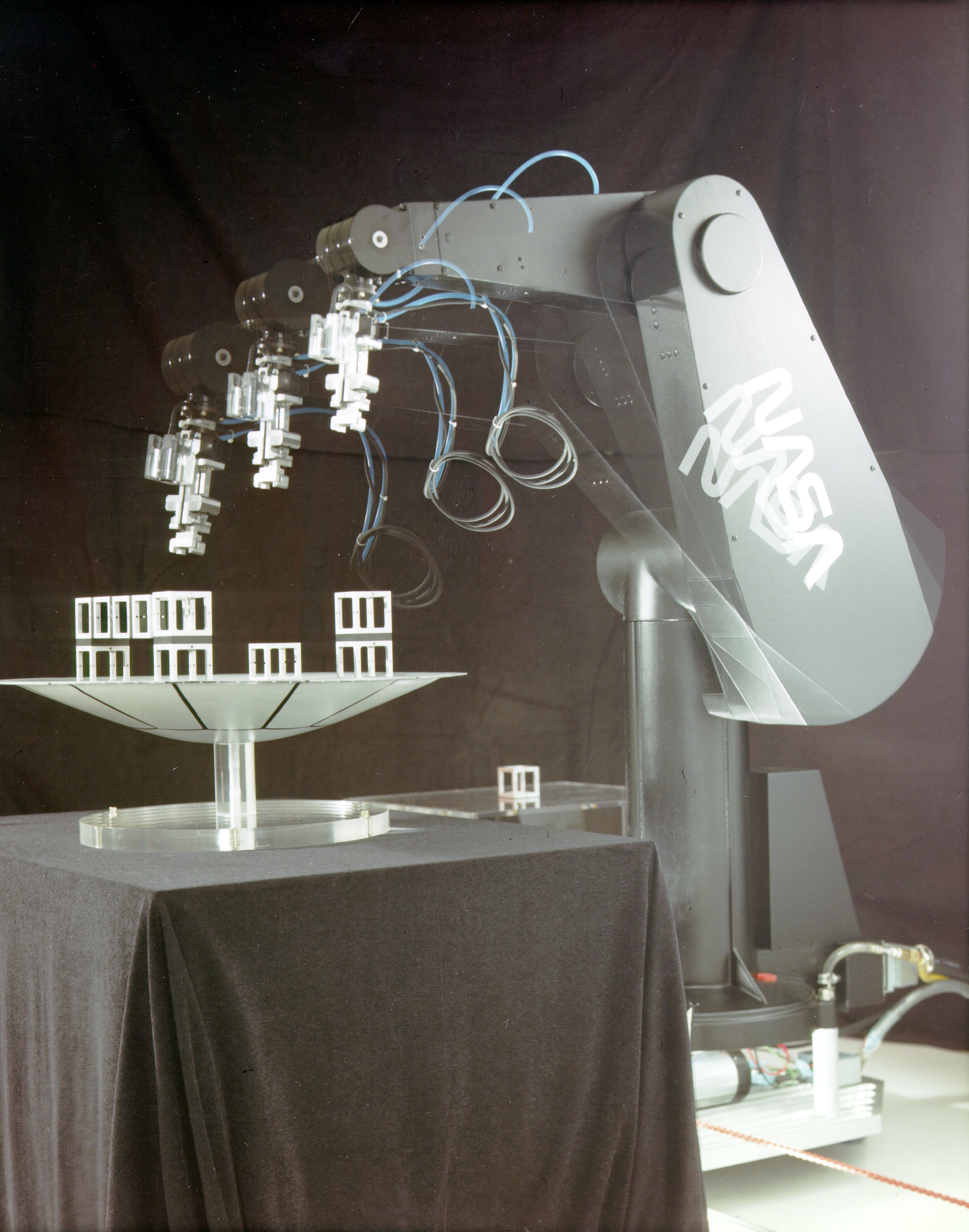
PUMA arm at NASA

The PUMA (Programmable Universal Machine for Assembly, or Programmable Universal Manipulation Arm) is an industrial robotic arm developed by Victor Scheinman at pioneering robot company Unimation. Initially developed by Unimation for General Motors, the PUMA was based on earlier designs Scheinman invented while at Stanford University based on sponsorship and mentoring from robot inventor George Devol.

Unimation produced PUMAs for years until being purchased by Westinghouse (ca. 1980), and later by Swiss company Stäubli (1988). Nokia Robotics manufactured about 1500 PUMA robots during the 1980s, the Puma-560 being their most popular model with customers. Some own Nokia Robotics products were also designed, like Nokia NS-16 Industrial Robot or NRS-15. Nokia sold their Robotics division in 1990.

In 2002, General Motors Controls, Robotics and Welding (CRW) organization donated the original prototype PUMA robot to the Smithsonian Institution's National Museum of American History. It joins a collection of historically important robots that includes an early Unimate and the Odetics Odex 1.

The essence of the design is represented in three categories; 200, 500, and 700 series. The 200 series is a smaller desktop unit. Notably, this model was used for the first robotic stereotactic brain biopsy in 1985. The 500 Series and can reach almost 2 meters up. This model is the more popular design and is the most recognizable configuration. The 700 series is the largest of the group and was intended for assembly line, paint, and welding work.

All designs consist of two main components: the mechanical arm and the control system. These are typically interconnected by one or two large multi-conductor cables. When two cables are used, one carries power to the servo motors and brakes while the second carries the position feedback for each joint back to the control system.

The control computer is based on the LSI-11 architecture which is very similar to PDP11 computers. The system has a boot program and basic debug tool loaded on ROM chips. The operating system is loaded from external storage through a serial port, usually from a floppy disk.

The control unit also contains the servo power supply, analog and digital feedback processing boards, and servo drive system.

The arm appears in the film Innerspace. An arm was displayed in the "Bird And The Robot" attraction at the World of Motion pavilion of EPCOT.

== Model 260 ==
- Six-axis arm with 3 axis making up a spherical wrist
- Maximum reach 400 mm from center axis to center of wrist
- Maximum payload: 2.2 kg
- Arm weight: 13.2 kg
- Repeatability ±0.05 mm
- max velocity: 1245 mm/sec straight line moves

Joint maximums	Degrees
Waist	315
Shoulder	320
Elbow	300
Wrist bend	236
Wrist roll	575
Tool flange	525

== Model 560 C ==
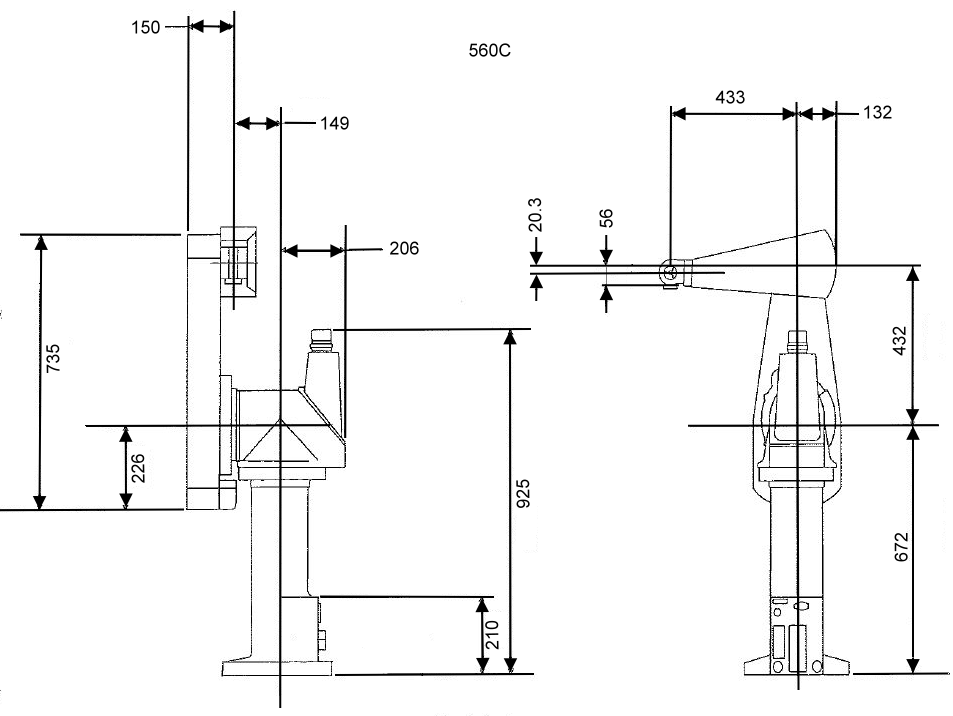
PUMA 560 C robot arm segment measurements.

- 6 Axis arm with 3 axis making up a spherical wrist.
- Maximum reach 878mm from center axis to center of wrist
- Software selectable payloads from 4 kg to 2.5 kg
- Arm weight: 83 kg (approximate)
- Repeatability ±0.1mm
- 2.5 kg max velocity: 500mm/sec straight line moves
- 4.0 kg max velocity: 470mm/sec straight line moves

Joint Maximums	Degrees
Waist	320
Shoulder	266
Elbow	284
Wrist Bend	200
Wrist Roll	280
Tool Flange	532

== Model 761 and 762 ==
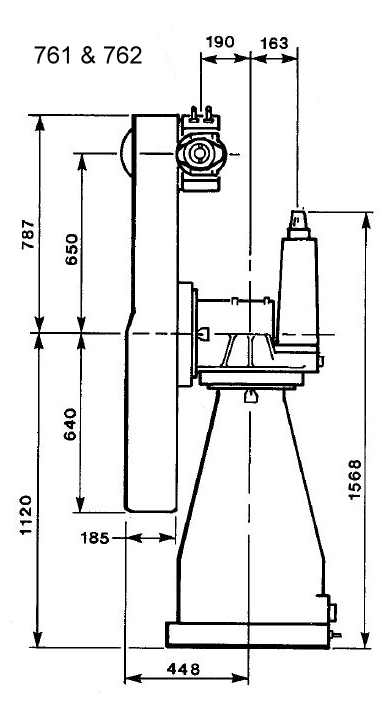
Physical measurements of the 761 and 762 PUMA arm segments. Both arms are identical for these measurements so only one image is needed.

- 6 Axis arm with 3 axis making up a spherical wrist.
- Maximum reach

  761: 1.50m from center axis to center of wrist 
  762: 1.25m from center axis to center of wrist[10]

- Arm mass:

  761: 600 kg   [10]
  762: 590 kg   [10]

- Payload:

  761:  10 kg[11]
  762: 20 kg [11]

- Repeatability ±0.2mm
- max velocity: 1000mm/sec straight line moves

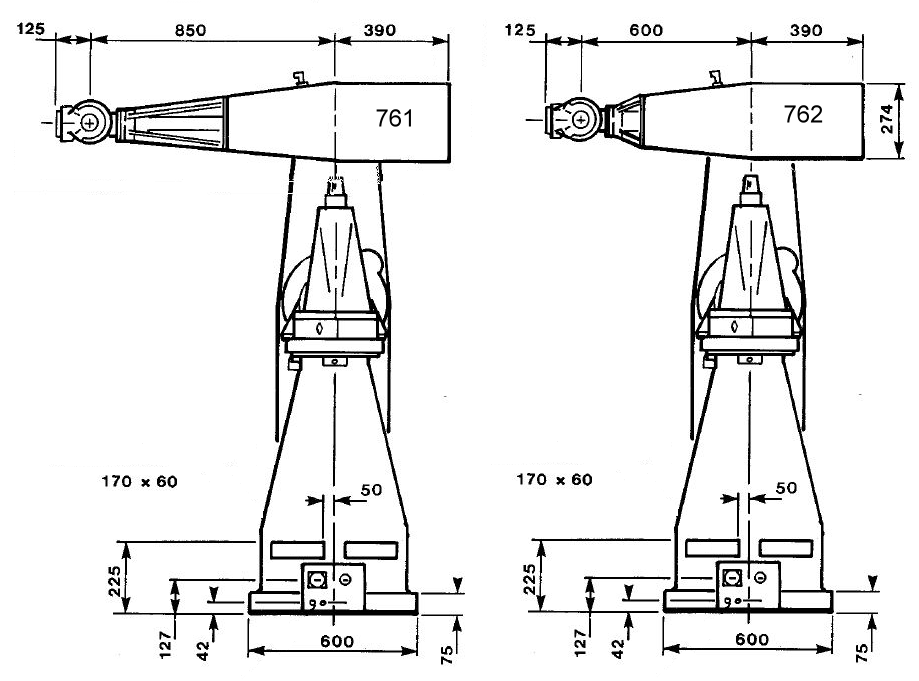
Physical measurements of the 761 and 762 PUMA arm segments, contrasting the lengths of the two forearm segments.

Joint Maximums	Degrees
Waist	320
Shoulder	220
Elbow	270
Wrist Bend	200
Wrist Roll	532
Tool Swivel	600

== Control system ==
Variable Assembly Language

== Books that Reference the PUMA design ==
- "Essentials of Mechatronics" Billingsley, John. John Wiley & Sons. Hoboken, NJ. 2006 ISBN 978-0-471-72341-7 Ch.9
- "Robot Modeling and Kinematics" Manseur, Rachid. DaVinci Engineering Press. Boston, MA. 2006 ISBN 1-58450-851-5 Ch.4-5
- "Robotics Technology and Flexible Automation 2nd Edition" S.R. Deb. McGraw Hill. New Delhi. 2010 ISBN 0-07-007791-6
