= Robot Hall of Fame =

Organization established by Carnegie Mellon University

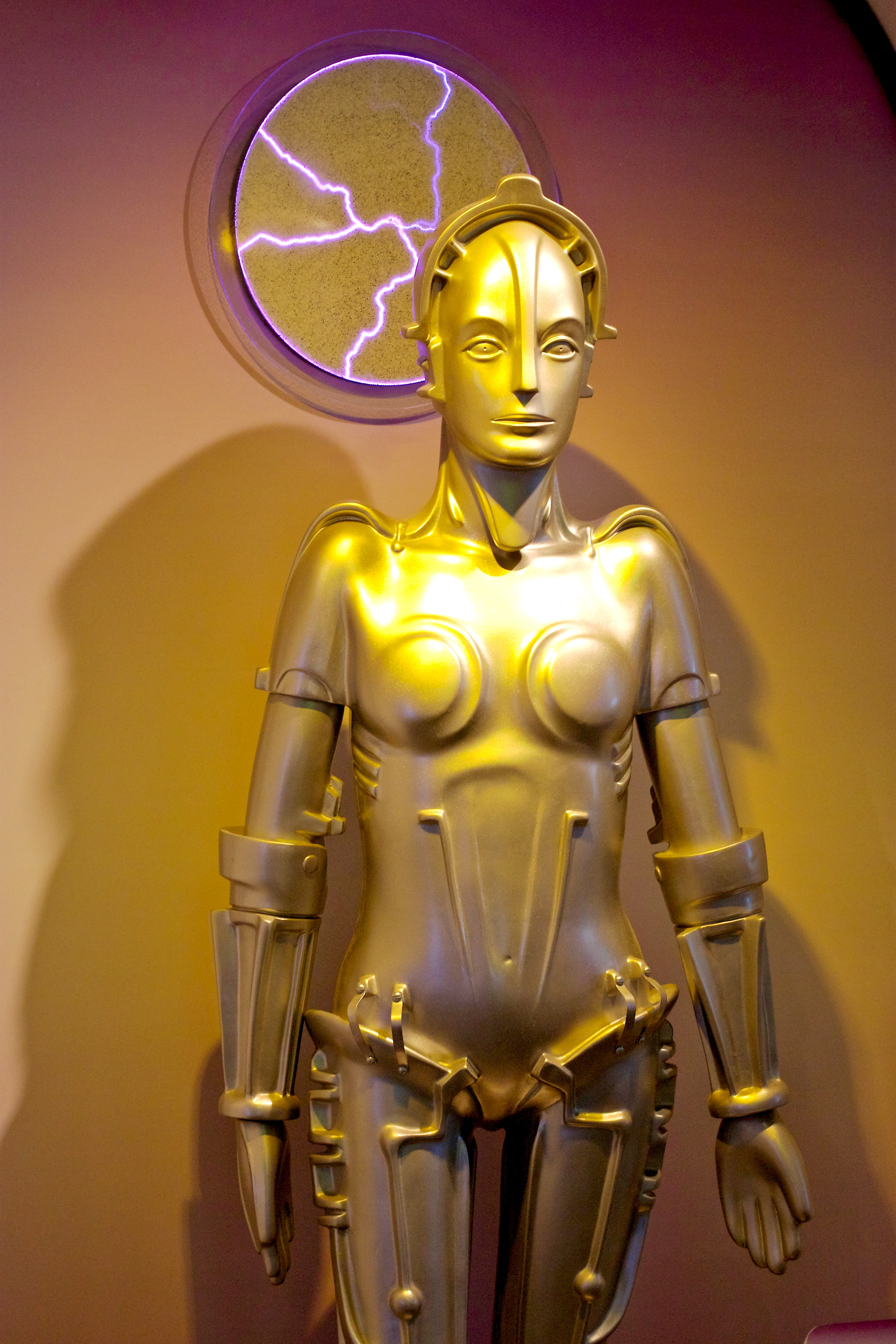
Replica of the Metropolis character Maria on display at the Kamin Science Center

The Robot Hall of Fame, established in 2003 by Carnegie Mellon University in Pittsburgh, Pennsylvania, honors significant robots in science, society, and technology. As of 2025, 34 real and fictional robots have been inducted.

The organization was established by the CMU's School of Computer Science as an acknowledgement of Pittsburgh's achievements in the field of robotics and with the aim of creating a broader awareness of the contributions of robotics in society. The idea was conceived by School of Computer Science dean James H. Morris, who described it as a means of honoring "robots that have served an actual or potentially useful function and demonstrated real skill, along with robots that entertain and those that have achieved worldwide fame in the context of fiction." The first induction ceremony was held at the Kamin Science Center on November 10, 2003. An exhibit named Roboworld was present at the Kamin Science Center from June 2009 until June 2022, featuring a physical embodiment of the hall of fame. Now some of them may be found in the lobby of Rangos Giant Cinema.

From 2003 to 2010, inductees to the Robot Hall of Fame were chosen by a panel of jurors. Members of the public could nominate a robot for induction with a one-paragraph explanation. In 2012, the voting process was altered. Nominations were gathered through a survey of 107 authorities on robotics, then divided into four categories: Education & Consumer, Entertainment, Industrial & Service, and Research. Members of the public were allowed to vote online for one of three nominees per category. Officials subsequently derived the final list of inductees from the survey and the public vote. Robot Hall of Fame director Shirley Saldamarco said of the changes:

The technology and art of robotics are advancing at an increasingly rapid rate and so the Robot Hall of Fame also must evolve. As more students, workers and consumers become accustomed to robots, it seems like a natural step to give the public a voice in selecting inductees.

== Inductees ==
HAL 9000, inducted in 2003

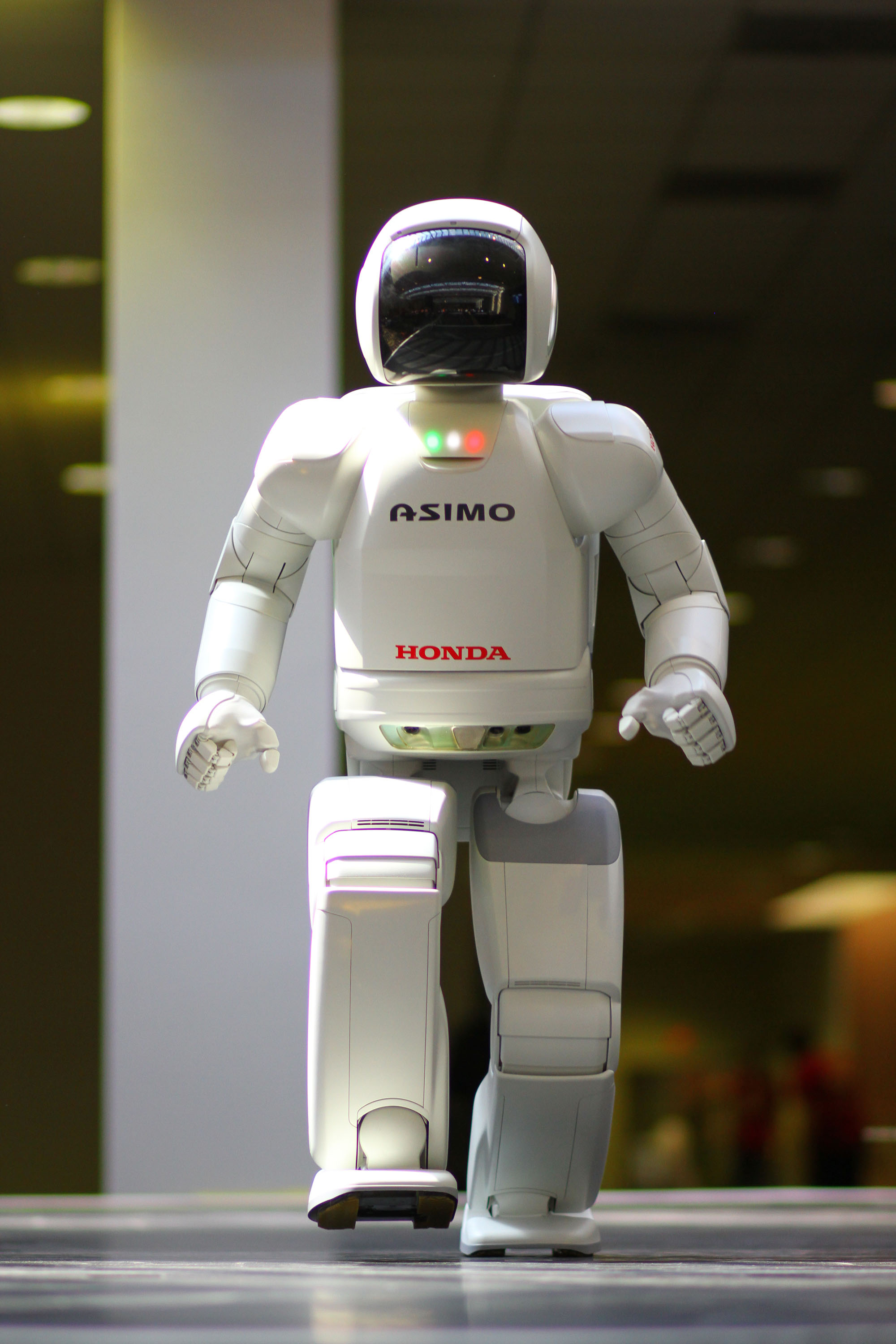
ASIMO, inducted in 2004

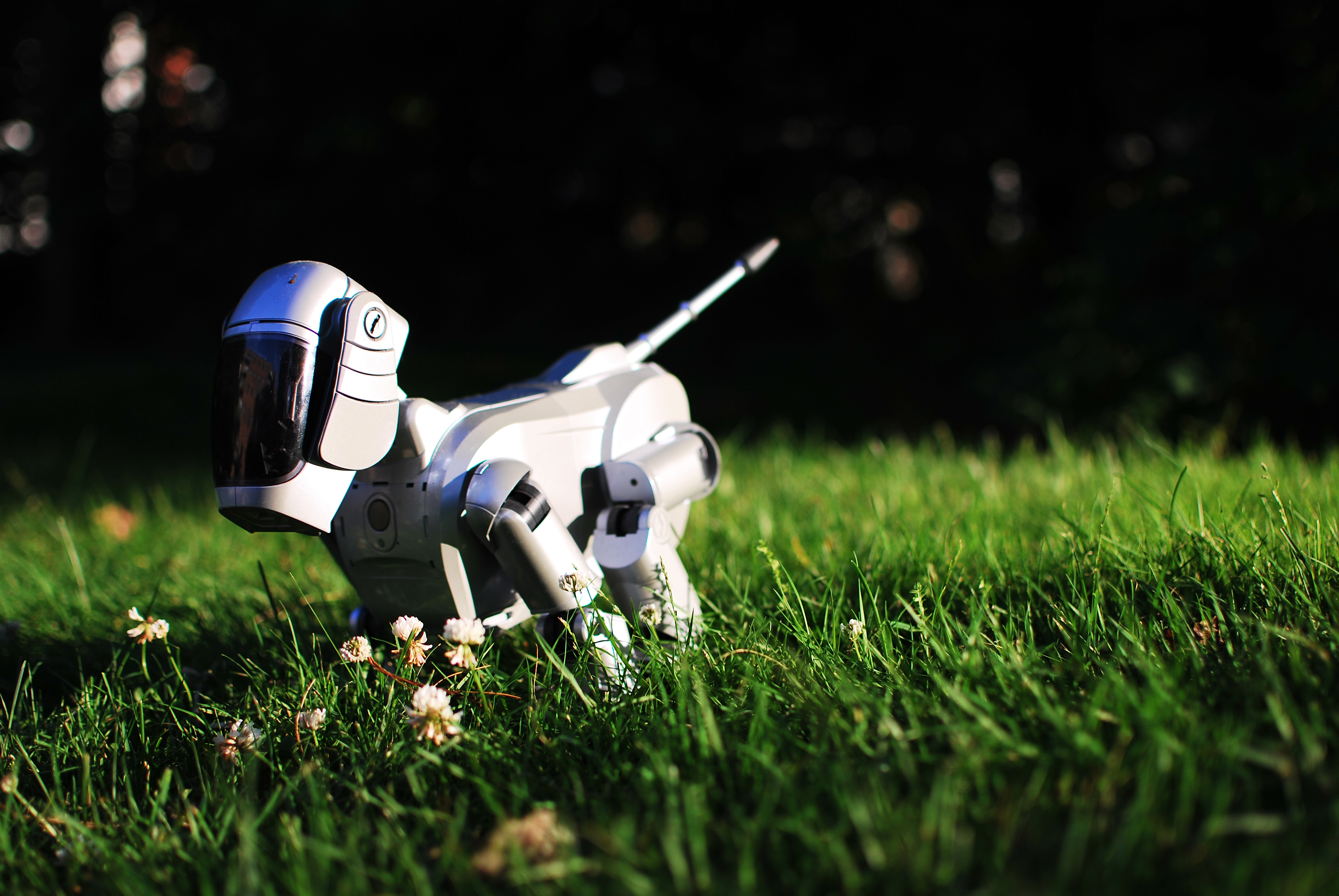
AIBO, inducted in 2006

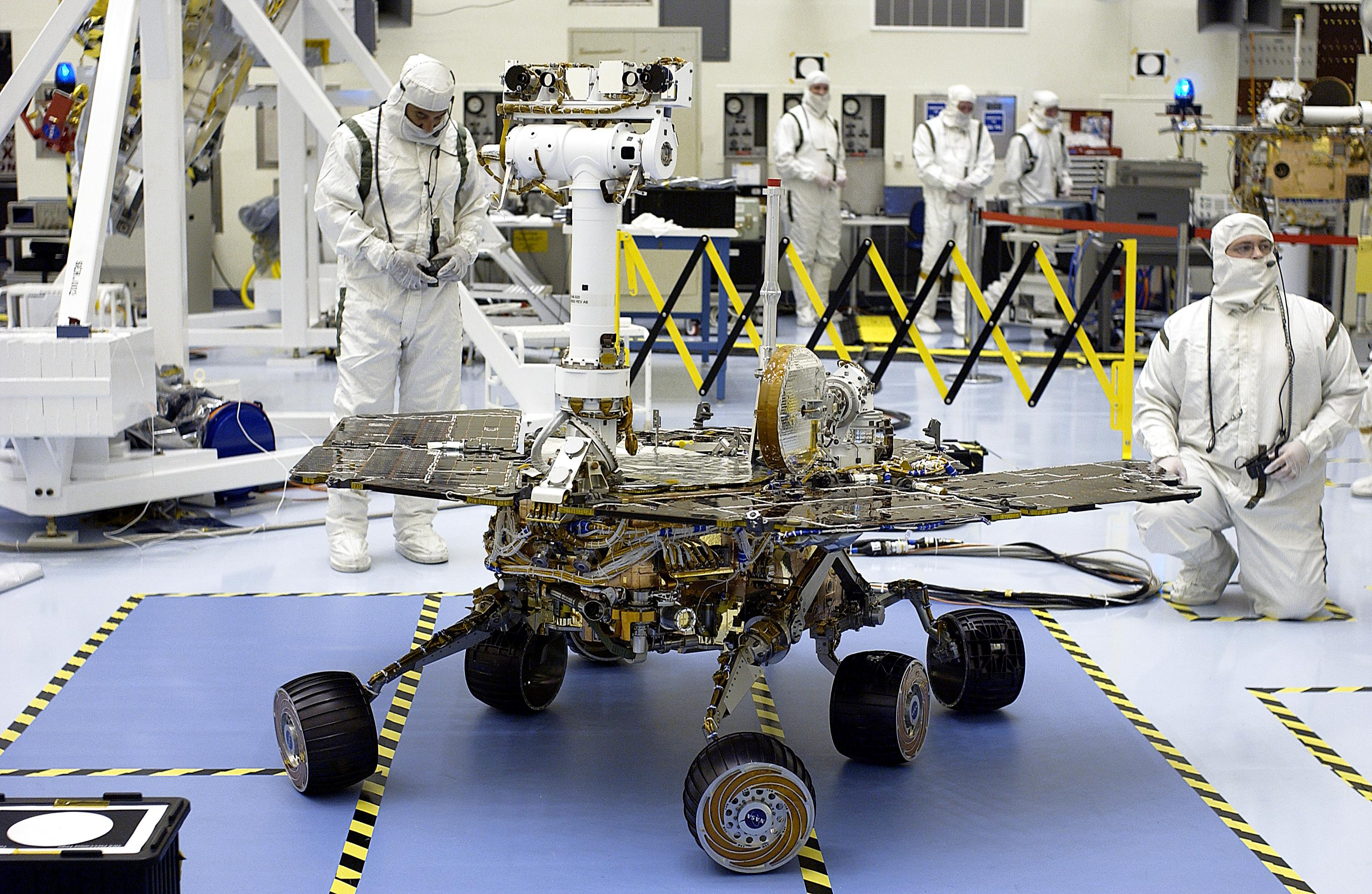
Opportunity, inducted in 2010

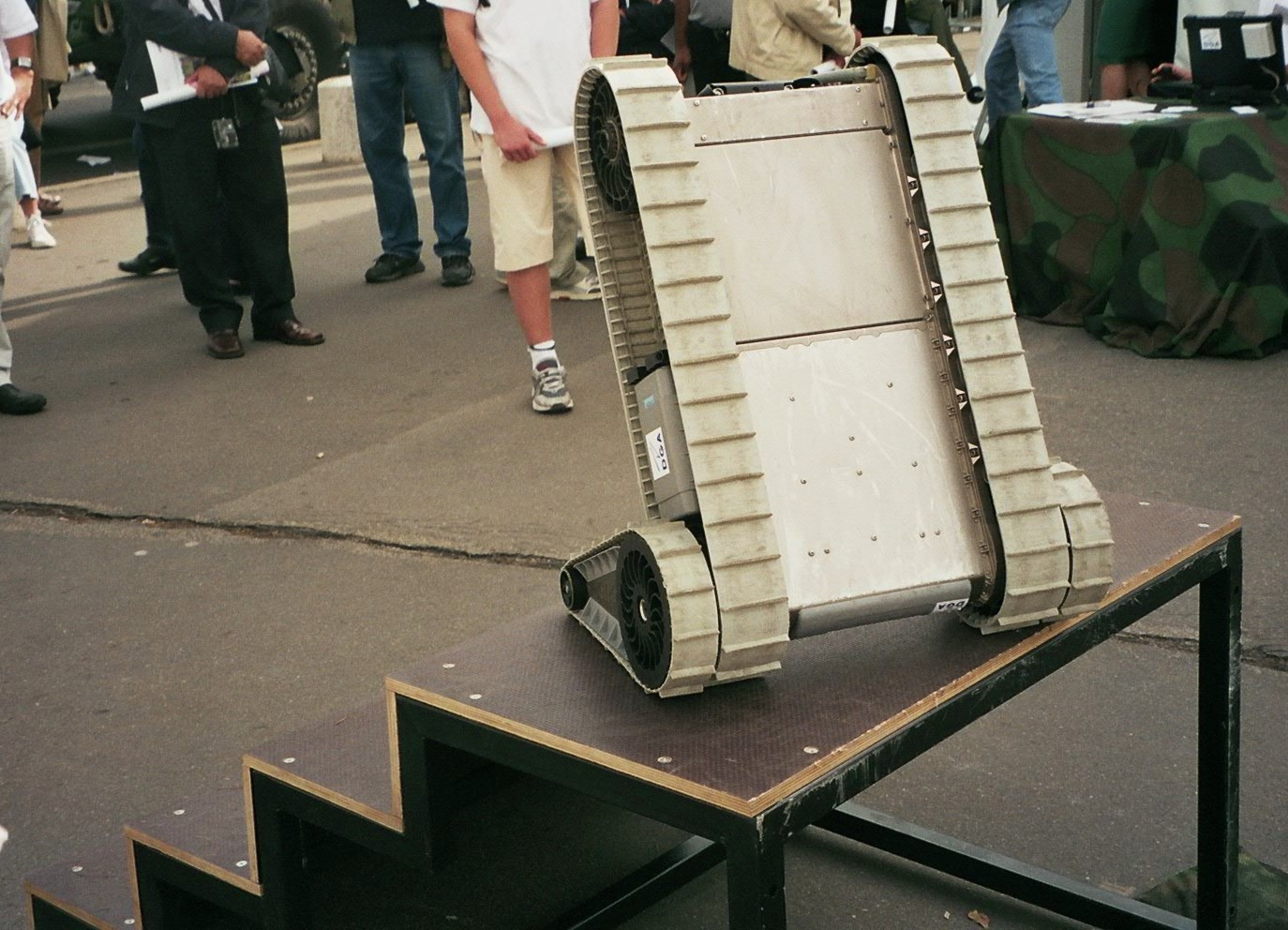
PackBot, inducted in 2012

List of robots in the Robot Hall of Fame
Year	Name	Description	Category	Ref.
2003	HAL 9000	Character from the film 2001: A Space Odyssey	Entertainment	
2003	R2-D2	Character from the Star Wars franchise	Entertainment	
2003	Sojourner	Mars rover developed by NASA	Research	
2003	Unimate	Industrial robot developed by George Devol and Joseph Engelberger; first industrial robot	Industrial & Service	
2004	ASIMO	Humanoid robot developed by Honda	Research	
2004	Astro Boy	Character from the Astro Boy franchise	Entertainment	
2004	C-3PO	Character from the Star Wars franchise	Entertainment	
2004	Robby the Robot	Character from the film Forbidden Planet	Entertainment	
2004	Shakey	Mobile robot developed by the Stanford Research Institute; first mobile robot able to reason about its own actions	Research	
2006	AIBO	Robotic pet manufactured by Sony	Education & Consumer	
2006	David	Character from the film A.I. Artificial Intelligence	Entertainment	
2006	Gort	Character from the film The Day the Earth Stood Still	Entertainment	
2006	Maria	Character from the film Metropolis	Entertainment	
2006	SCARA	Industrial robotic arm developed by the University of Yamanashi	Industrial & Service	
2008	Data	Character from the Star Trek franchise	Entertainment	
2008	Lego Mindstorms	Robot kit toy series manufactured by the Lego Group	Education & Consumer	
2008	Navlab 5	Autonomous robotic vehicle developed by the Carnegie Mellon School of Computer Science	Research	
2008	Raibert Hopper	Hopping robot developed by Marc Raibert; first self-balancing hopping robot	Research	
2010	da Vinci Surgical System	Robotic surgical system manufactured by Intuitive Surgical	Industrial & Service	
2010	Dewey	Character from the film Silent Running	Entertainment	
2010	Huey	Character from the film Silent Running	Entertainment	
2010	Louie	Character from the film Silent Running	Entertainment	
2010	Opportunity	Mars rover developed by NASA	Research	
2010	Roomba	Autonomous robotic vacuum cleaner manufactured by iRobot	Education & Consumer	
2010	Spirit	Mars rover developed by NASA	Research	
2010	Terminator (T-800)	Character from the Terminator franchise	Entertainment	
2012	BigDog	Quadrupedal military robot developed by Boston Dynamics	Research	
2012	Nao	Autonomous humanoid robot manufactured by Aldebaran Robotics	Education & Consumer	
2012	PackBot	Military robot developed by iRobot	Industrial & Service	
2012	WALL-E	Character from the film WALL-E	Entertainment	
2015	Robot (B-9)	Character from the TV series Lost in Space	Entertainment	
2017	The Iron Giant	Character from the film The Iron Giant	Entertainment	
2021	Crow T. Robot	Character from the TV series Mystery Science Theater 3000	Entertainment	
2021	Tom Servo	Character from the TV series Mystery Science Theater 3000	Entertainment	

== See also ==
- Robotics Institute
