= H. Grady Rylander =

American mechanical engineer

H. Grady Rylander Jr (23 August 1921 – 22 May 2010) was an American mechanical engineer who spent 63 years at the University of Texas as researcher, professor and administrator.

He was born on a farm in Pearsall, Texas and was educated at Pearsall High School. He entered the University of San Antonio (now Trinity University) in 1939, transferring to the University of Texas at Austin in 1941, where he was awarded a BSME in June 1943. In the same year, he had married Grace Elizabeth Zirkel, with whom he had 4 children.

Following graduation he worked during World War II for Westinghouse Electric Corporation in Pennsylvania, conducting fatigue tests on gas turbine blades and designing bearings and lubrication systems for aircraft gas turbines.

In 1947 Rylander was appointed assistant professor at UT Austin, where he taught heat and power engineering, machine design, and tribology. He was awarded an MS degree in 1952. He was granted leave of absence to work for a Ph.D. degree on the behavior of multiphase lubricants at Georgia Institute of Technology, which was awarded in 1965. In 1968 UT Austin promoted him professor.

In 1970, he began a research project on the design of homopolar generators, which store large amounts of energy and discharge high-powered short duration pulses of electricity. This work led to the founding of the Center for Electromechanics (CEM) in 1977, which Rylander himself directed until 1985, during which period CEM grew into a world-class research unit concentrating on the development of pulsed electric power and inertial energy storage machines.

He served as associate chairman of the Mechanical Engineering Department at UT Austin from 1974 to 1976, and chairman from 1976 to 1986, during which time the department achieved substantial growth and diversification. In 1985 he was awarded the ASME Leonardo Da Vinci Award from ASME.

He died in 2010 after 63 years at UT Austin.
