= Joseph Engelberger =

American pioneer in robotics

- Engelberger in c. 1987
- Born: Joseph Frederick Engelberger; July 26, 1925; Brooklyn, New York City, US
- Died: December 1, 2015 (aged 90); Newtown, Connecticut, US
- Education: Columbia University (B.S., 1946; M.S., 1949)
- Occupations: Engineer, entrepreneur
- Known for: Robotics
- Awards: Japan Prize (1997)

Joseph Frederick Engelberger (July 26, 1925 – December 1, 2015) was an American physicist, engineer and entrepreneur. Often regarded as the "Father of Robotics". Licensing the original patent awarded to inventor George Devol, Engelberger developed the first industrial robot in the United States, the Unimate, in the 1950s. Later, he worked as an entrepreneur and vocal advocate of robotic technology beyond the manufacturing plant in a variety of fields, including service industries, health care, and space exploration.

== Biography ==
=== Early life and education ===
Joseph Frederick Engelberger was born on July 26, 1925, in Brooklyn, New York. He grew up in Connecticut during the Great Depression, but later returned to New York City for his college education.

Engelberger received his B.S. in physics in 1946, and M.S. in Electrical Engineering in 1949 from Columbia University. He worked as an engineer with Manning, Maxwell and Moore, where he met inventor George Devol at a Westport cocktail party in 1956, two years after Devol had designed and patented a rudimentary industrial robotic arm. However, Manning, Maxwell and Moore was sold and Engelberger's division was closed that year.

=== Unimation ===
Finding himself jobless but with a business partner and an idea, Engelberger co-founded Unimation with Devol, creating the world's first robotics company. In 1957, he also founded Consolidated Controls Corporation. As president of Unimation, Engelberger collaborated with Devol to engineer and produce an industrial robot under the brand name Unimate. The first Unimate robotic arm was installed at a General Motors Plant in Ewing Township, New Jersey, in 1961.

The introduction of robotics to the manufacturing process effectively transformed the automotive industry, with Chrysler and the Ford Motor Company soon following General Motors' lead and installing Unimates in their manufacturing facilities. The rapid adoption of the technology also provided Unimation with a working business model: after selling the first Unimate at a $35,000 loss, as demand increased, the company was able to begin building the robotic arms for significantly less and thus began to turn a substantial profit. Over the next two decades, the Japanese took the lead by investing heavily in robots to replace people performing certain tasks. In Japan, Engelberger was widely hailed as a key player in the postwar ascendancy of Japanese manufacturing quality and efficiency.

In 1966, Engelberger and a Unimate robot appeared on The Tonight Show Starring Johnny Carson. In the segment, the robot poured a beer, sank a golf putt, and directed the band.

An early proponent of increased investment in robotic systems, Engelberger published articles and gave congressional testimony on the value of using automation in space long before the successes of NASA's Mars landers, Galileo, and other unmanned space science missions. He also consulted for NASA on the use of robotics in space exploration.

Unimation purchased Victor Scheinman's Vicarm Inc. in 1977, and with Scheinman's help, the company created and began producing the Programmable Universal Machine for Assembly (PUMA), an all-electric robotic arm, designed to facilitate an arm solution that allowed full computer control using Scheinman's cutting-edge VAL programming language. The automotive companies that had been Unimation's earliest and most reliable clients began moving away from the use of hydraulically powered robotic arms, like the Unimate, in the early 1980s in favor of electric motors, a change that Engelberger vehemently opposed. Sales fell, and the company was acquired by Westinghouse in 1982 for $107 million. Engelberger, who had served as Unimation's chief executive since its inception, left the company not long thereafter.

=== Magnetic propulsion ===
In 1963 Engelberger filed with the US Patent Office his Application Ser. No. 324,928, then a second one with Ser. No. 638,666 in 1967, and US Patent No. 3,504,868 “Space Propulsion System” was registered in 1970. Numerical pioneering propositions and ideas of Engelberger in this work may be considered as a prospective competitor with rocketry and a possible means for interstellar flight.

=== HelpMate ===
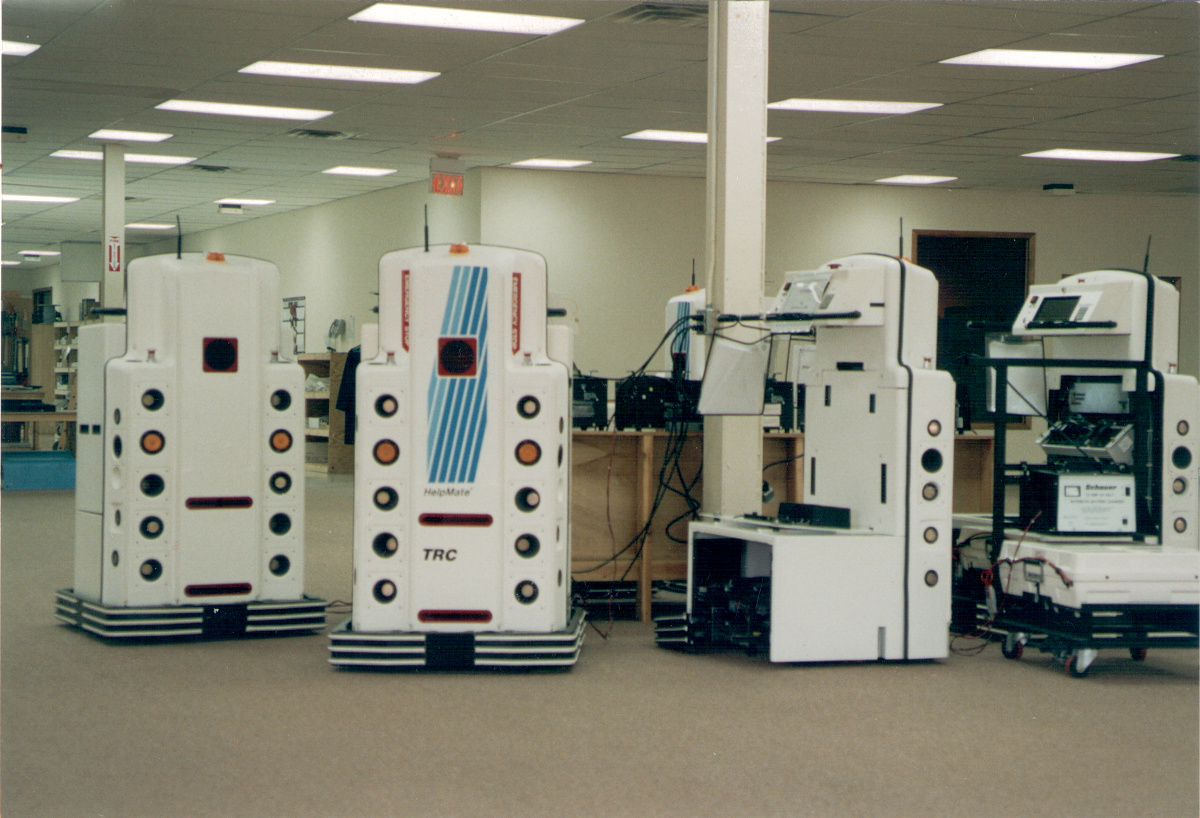
Four Helpmate robots on the floor of Transitions Research Corporation in Danbury, 1993

After observing the help for his aging parents, Engelberger saw the robotics automations could be used in the medical field. In 1984, Engelberger founded Transitions Research Corporation. He introduced the HelpMate, a mobile robot hospital courier, as the flagship product of his new company. He hoped to kick-start a new industry for in-home robots, but he started in 1988 by selling his first HelpMate to Danbury Hospital, located in the same Connecticut city where his company was based. The medical robot was successful enough that the hospital ended up purchasing another, and within a decade, well over 100 hospitals worldwide operated HelpMates, whether purchased outright or rented from Engelberger's company, which he renamed HelpMate Robotics Inc.

After Engelberger was awarded the Japan Prize in 1997, Senator Joseph Lieberman of Connecticut delivered a floor speech in the U.S. Senate in praise and recognition of the inventor, calling HelpMate Robotics "an example of the way that a patient federal investment in science and technology can lead to new products that employ Americans and make for a better quality of life."

HelpMate was acquired by Cardinal Health in the late 1990s, a move Engelberger came to regret, complaining that the new owners moved away from his preferred model of renting out robots toward selling off used, depreciated models.

=== Later life ===
The 2000 World Automation Congress was dedicated to Engelberger, who delivered the keynote address. Even after his departure from HelpMate and well into his 80s, he remained active in the promotion and development of robots for use in elder care. He notably discouraged the notion of legged robots, arguing that robots should use wheels for locomotion, although he supported the use of robotic arms to allow the machines to interact with their surroundings. He worked on developing a two-armed robot to act as a "servant-companion" to seniors with limited mobility.

Engelberger died on December 1, 2015, in Newtown, Connecticut, a little more than four months after celebrating his 90th birthday.

== Publications ==
Engelberger published Robotics in Practice in 1980. The book became a classic in the field and has been translated into six languages. Robotics in Practice was followed by Robotics in Service in 1989. Engelberger received US Patent No. 3,504,868 in 1970 that gave the priority in the technology of the space magnetic propulsion to the United States of America.

== Awards and honors ==
Engelberger was elected to the National Academy of Engineering in 1984. He was also honored among "The 1000 makers of the 20st Century" by The Sunday Times in 1992. Additional honors include the Progress Award of the Society of Manufacturing Engineers, the 1982 Nyselius Award from the American Die Casting Institution, the 1982 Leonardo da Vinci Award of the American Society of Mechanical Engineers, the 1982 American Machinist Award, the 1983 Golden Omega Award at the Electrical Electronics Insulation Conference, the 1983 McKechnie Award from the University of Liverpool, the 1984 Egleston Medal from Columbia University, the 1997 Beckman Award for pioneering and original research in the field of automation, and the 1997 Japan Prize, the highest Japanese technology honor, for the establishment of the robot industry. He also received the IEEE Robotics and Automation Award in 2004.

== Legacy ==
The Robotics Industries Association (now the A3 - Association for Advancing Automation) annually presents the Joseph F. Engelberger Awards to "persons who have contributed outstandingly to the furtherance of the science and practice of robotics." The award was first given in 1977.

Engelberger's most famous co-invention, the Unimate industrial robotic arm, was among the first inductees into the Robot Hall of Fame in 2003.
