= Inland Fisher Guide Plant (New Jersey) =

GM factory in Ewing Township, New Jersey, US

Coordinates: 40.2647°N 74.8095°W

The Inland Fisher Guide Plant was a General Motors facility located in the West Trenton section of Ewing Township, New Jersey, that opened in 1938 as one of its most modern plants and was operated by the firm for 60 years. The facility was initially part of the Ternstedt division of GM's Fisher Body unit and was used to construct auto parts such as body moldings, door handles and other interior components. During World War II, the facility was converted to build torpedo bombers for the United States Navy as part of GM's Eastern Aircraft.

In 1961, the plant was the site of the first industrial robot used in the United States. At the time of its closure in 1998, the plant made auto components for Delphi Automotive. The buildings on the site were demolished. By 2011 funding had been received by Ewing Township from the federal government to remediate contamination on the site in anticipation of plans to redevelop the area for commercial purposes.

== Construction ==
The plant was constructed at a cost of $2 million (equivalent to $44.8 million in 2025) and had its groundbreaking ceremonies in August 1937 that were attended by Governor of New Jersey Harold G. Hoffman. The plant was dedicated in November 1938 at ceremonies attended by GM Chairman Alfred P. Sloan and company president William S. Knudsen. The facility employed a crew of 1,500 when it opened in September 1938, though plans were made to double the number of employees to accommodate expectations that production would be doubled as the condition of the American economy improved in the wake of the strong Republican gains in the 1938 congressional elections, which Sloan described as being an "indication of returning common sense."

== War effort ==
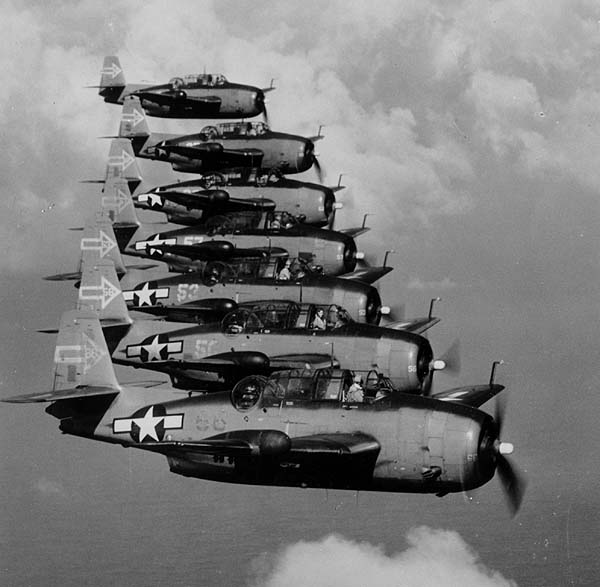
Seven Grumman TBM-3D Avenger bombers of night torpedo squadron VT(N)-90 flying in formation in January 1945.

Car part production at the plant ended on December 12, 1941, and one month later the factory became a unit of Eastern Aircraft, one of five former General Motors plants in the area which was shifted to the war effort and used to construct the TBM variants of the Grumman TBF Avenger torpedo bomber for the United States Navy during World War II. Subassemblies from other factories were shipped to Ewing Township via the Reading Railroad and were combined with other components built at Ewing, with the completed planes brought to Skillman Airport (later known as Trenton-Mercer Airport) for delivery to the military after test flights were completed. The first Avenger built at the plant was test flown in November 1942, less than eight months after the facility had started being converted to military purposes. A total of 7,800 Avengers were constructed at the plant in Ewing, including the plane George H. W. Bush was flying on September 2, 1944, when he was shot down over the Pacific Ocean by Japanese anti-aircraft fire. In September 1945, the Navy turned almost all of the plants it had acquired during the war over to the Surplus Property Administration; portions of the Ewing plant were one of the limited number of exceptions. After the war ended, the plant was converted to return to production of auto components.

== First robot ==
In 1961, the facility became the first commercial user in the United States to use a programmable industrial robot to replace human workers, installing the 4,000 pounds (1,800 kg) Unimate automated hydraulic arm developed by George Devol and Joseph Engelberger. It carried units of aluminum door handles and other automotive components weighing as much as 40 pounds (18 kg) into cooling pools; such units had just been die cast from molten metal, and the use of robots eliminated the risks to employees of handling extremely hot metal pieces. A task previously performed by three shifts of employees was converted to be done by the robot. The first production Unimate was donated to the Smithsonian Institution in 1971 after being used for 100,000 hours during its 10 years of continuous operation at the Ewing plant.

== Closure ==
In December 1992, General Motors announced that what was then known as the Delphi Interior & Lighting Systems plant would be closed in 1993, which would mean that the 2,200 people working there would be out of work. In September 1993, William D. Hurley of Independent Component Systems announced that a deal had been reached to acquire the plant from General Motors, as part of an agreement that had been reached with the assistance of the State of New Jersey, though the transaction never was completed. After reaching concessions with Local 731 of the United Auto Workers, General Motors announced in May 1994 that the plant would be kept open as the result of an agreement with the UAW under which the plant's workforce would be reduced by 25% as an effort to reduce costs.

In 1998, as the plant was no longer economically competitive with other manufacturing facilities, it was permanently closed, resulting in the loss of jobs for the 900 people who had been producing seat adjusters, moldings and painted exterior components. The last day of operation was on June 12, 1998, and the 350 workers still on the payroll, who were promised job opportunities elsewhere, were given commemorative books as they punched out for their last time.

The plant was demolished and General Motors paid annual property taxes of $75,000 as of 2010 for the 80 acres (32 ha) of land previously occupied by the plant, the minimum that would be due for unimproved property. While the building had been assessed for $7 million while it was operating, the value of the property for taxation purposes had declined to $940,000 by 2010 for the vacant land.

The site has been targeted for cleanup and commercial redevelopment by Ewing Township, with a $10.4 million grant received in 2011 to cover the costs of remediation of the site. The funds would come from the Revitalizing Auto Communities Environmental Response Trust established following the 2009 bankruptcy filing by General Motors, to be used for the cleanup of 89 properties that had been owned by GM. It will be distributed to Ewing Township as the remediation project progresses under the supervision of the New Jersey Department of Environmental Protection.
