= 321 kinematic structure =

Robot arm design that allows inverse arm solution in closed form

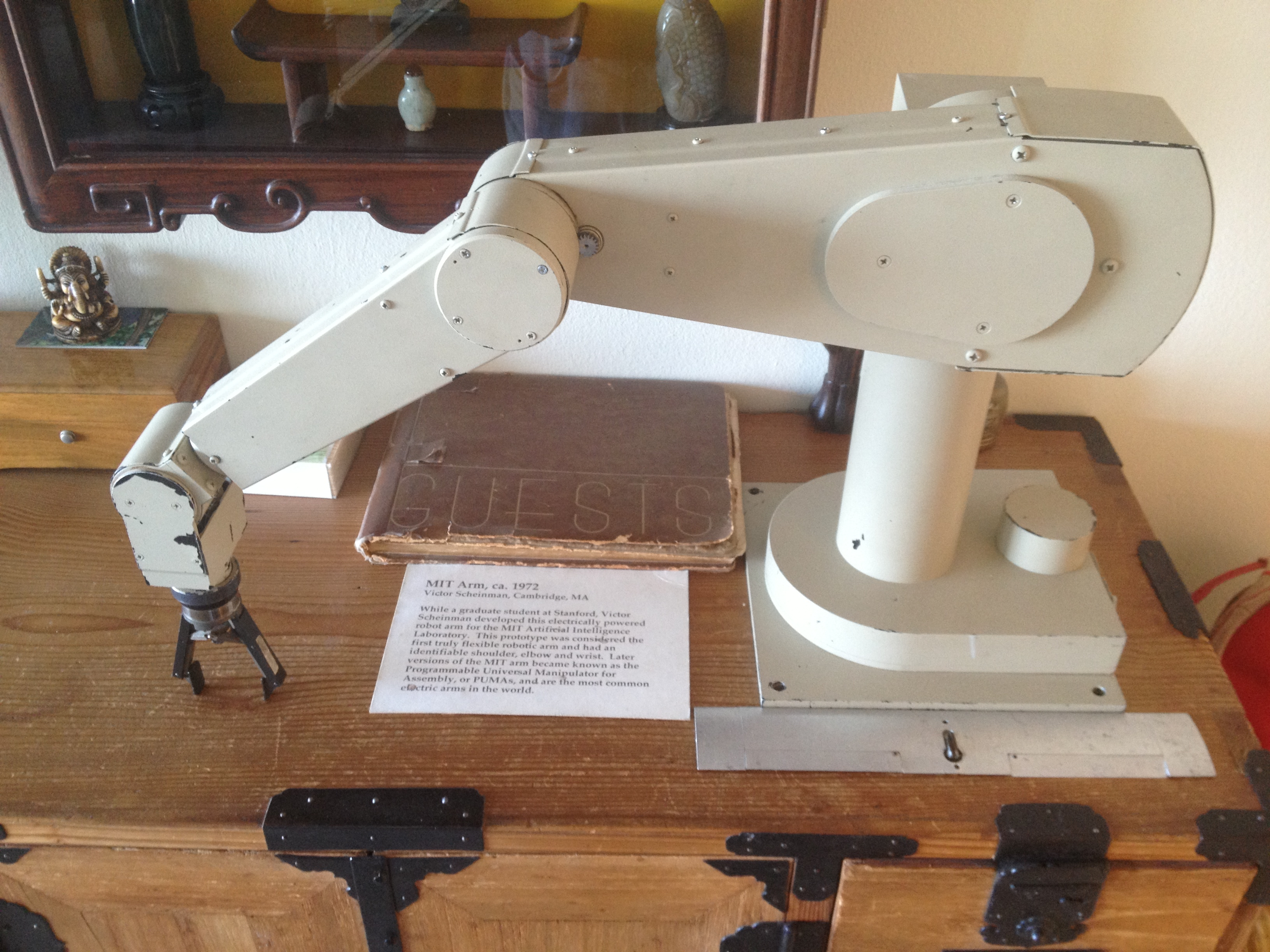
Victor Scheinman's MIT Arm, built for MIT's Artificial Intelligence Lab c. 1972, the first arm designed with a 321 kinematic structure

321 kinematic structure is a design method for robotic arms (serial manipulators), invented by Donald L. Pieper and used in most commercially produced robotic arms. The inverse kinematics of serial manipulators with six revolute joints, and with three consecutive joints intersecting, can be solved in closed form, i.e. a set of equations can be written that give the joint positions required to place the end of the arm in a particular position and orientation. An arm design that does not follow these design rules typically requires an iterative algorithm to solve the inverse kinematics problem.

The 321 design is an example of a 6R wrist-partitioned manipulator: the three wrist joints intersect, the two shoulder and elbow joints are parallel, the first joint intersects the first shoulder joint orthogonally (at a right angle). Many other industrial robots, such as the PUMA, have a kinematic structure that deviates a little bit from the 321 structure. The offsets move the singular positions of the robot away from places in the workspace where they are likely to cause problems.
