= ASME Leonardo Da Vinci Award =

ASME Leonardo Da Vinci World Award
- Awarded for: Eminent achievement in the design or invention of a product which is universally recognized as an important advance in machine design.
- Country: United States
- Presented by: ASME
- Rewards: Certificate and Medal
- First award: 1978

The American Society of Mechanical Engineers Design and Engineering Division awards yearly the Leonardo Da Vinci Award to eminent engineers whose design or invention is recognized as an important advance in machine design. The award is named after Leonardo da Vinci.

== Winners ==
Years	Recipient
1978	Richard R. Wareham
1979	Arthur L. Hubbard
1980	Henry O. Fuchs
1981	Charles D. Bleau
1982	Joseph F. Engelberger
1983	L. Sigfred Linderoth, Jr.
1984	Robert C. Distin
1985	H. Grady Rylander
1986	Kenneth W. Boling
1987	Stephen C. Jacobsen
1988	Kenneth J. Waldron
1989	Dimitry G. Grabbe
1990	Victor Scheinman
1991	-
1992	Stephen J. Bartholet
1993	-
1994	-
1995	Robert R. Donaldson
1996	Steven A. Velinsky
1997	Sridhar Kota
1998	William C. Shaw
1999	David L. Trumper
2000	Joel S. Spira
2001	Paul Sheldon
2002	Paul Sheldon
2003	J. Edward Colgate
2004	Alexander S. Slocum
2005	Dara Sabahi, Donald R. Sevilla, James A. Baughman, Randel A. Lindemann, Richard A. Rainen, Adam D. Steltzner, Joseph Melko, Christopher J. Voorhees
2006	-
2007	-
2008	-
2009	S.V. Sreenivasan
2010	Shorya Awtar
2011	-
2012	-
2013	Mohan Bodduluri
2014	Feng Gao
2015	Noel Perkins
2016	-
2017	Lei Zuo
2018	-
2019	Dikai Liu
2020	-
2021	Shuxin Wang
2022	-
2023	Wei-Hsin Liao

== See also ==
- Other awards and medals of the ASME
- ASME Achievement awards
- ASME Medal - ASME highest award
- List of engineering awards
