= Stanford arm =

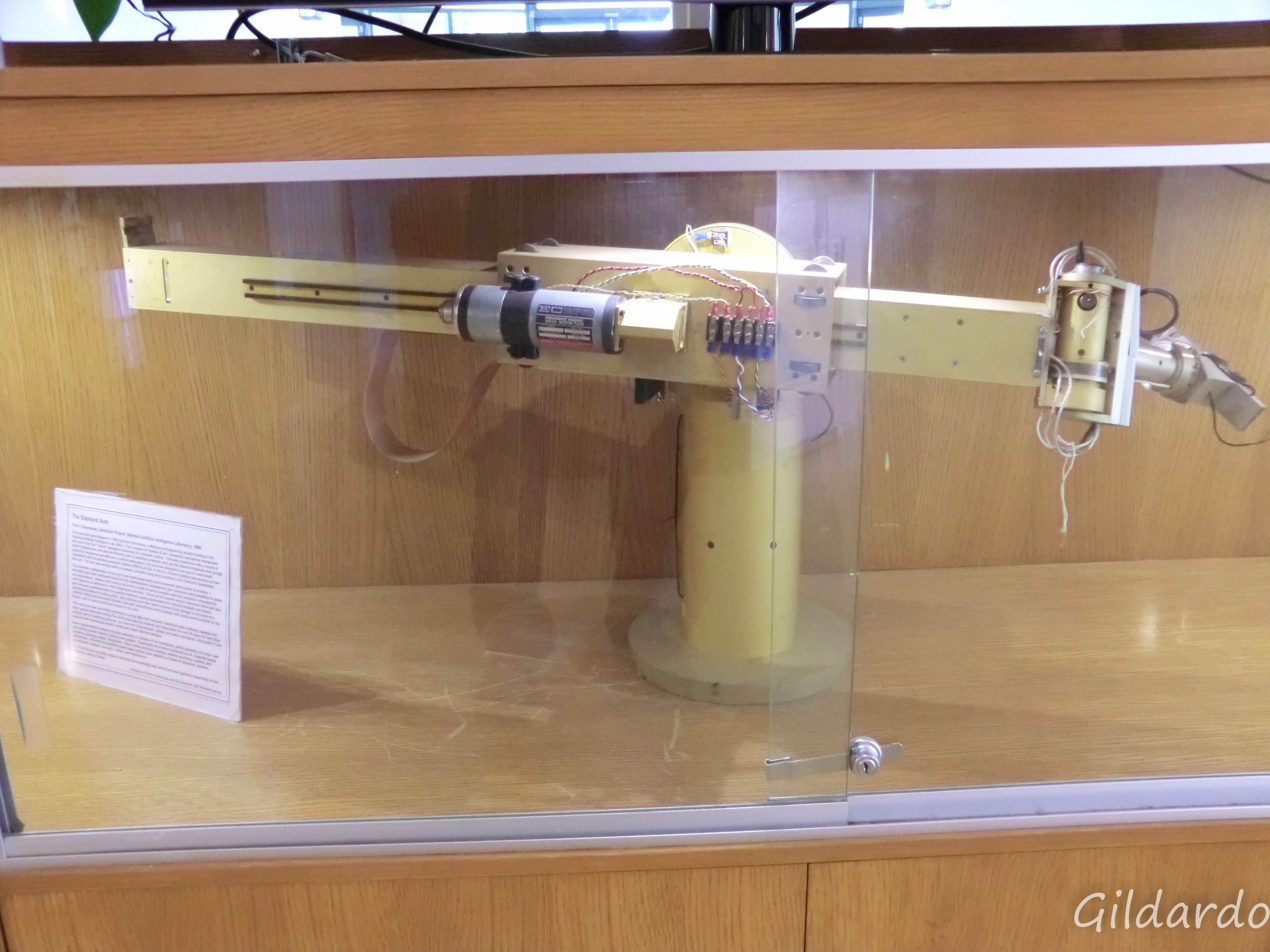
The Stanford arm, on display at Stanford University

The Stanford arm is an industrial robot with six degrees of freedom, designed at Stanford University by Victor Scheinman in 1969. The Stanford arm is a serial manipulator whose kinematic chain consists of two revolute joints at the base, a prismatic joint, and a spherical joint. Because it includes several kinematic pairs, it is often used as an educational example in robotic manufacturing.
