= George Devol =

American inventor and robotics pioneer

- George Devol in 1982
- Born: February 20, 1912; Louisville, Kentucky
- Died: August 11, 2011 (aged 99); Wilton, Connecticut
- Occupations: Inventor, entrepreneur
- Spouse: Evelyn Jahelka

George Charles Devol Jr. (February 20, 1912 – August 11, 2011) was an American inventor, best known for creating Unimate, the first industrial robot. The National Inventors Hall of Fame says, "Devol's patent for the first digitally operated programmable robotic arm represents the foundation of the modern robotics industry."

== Early life ==
George Devol was born in an upper-middle-class family in Louisville, Kentucky. He attended Riordan Prep school.

== United Cinephone ==
Phantom Doorman automatic door

Foregoing higher education, Devol went into business in 1932, forming United Cinephone to produce variable area recording directly onto film for the new sound motion pictures ("talkies"). However, he later learned that companies like RCA and Western Electric were working in the same area, and discontinued the product.

== World War II ==
In 1939, Devol applied for a patent for proximity controls for use in laundry press machines, based on a radio frequency field. This control would automatically open and close laundry presses when workers approached the machines. After World War II began, the patent office told Devol that his patent application would be placed on hold for the duration of the conflict.

Around that time, Devol sold his interest in United Cinephone and approached Sperry Gyroscope to pitch his ideas on radar technology. He was retained by Sperry as manager of the Special Projects Department, which developed radar devices and microwave test equipment.

In 1943, he organized General Electronics Industries in Greenwich, Connecticut, as a subsidiary of the Auto Ordnance Corporation. General Electronics produced counter-radar devices until the end of the war. General Electronics was one of the largest producers of radar and radar counter-measure equipment for the U.S. Navy, U.S. Army Air Force and other government agencies. The company's radar counter-measure systems were on Allied planes on D-Day.

Over a difference of opinion regarding the future of certain projects, Devol resigned from Auto Ordinance and joined RCA. After a short stint as eastern sales manager of electronics products, which he felt "wasn't his ball of wax", Devol left RCA to develop ideas that eventually led to the patent application for the first industrial robot. In 1946, he applied for a patent on a magnetic recording system for controlling machines and a digital playback device for machines.

Devol was part of the team that developed the first commercial use of microwave oven technology, the Speedy Weeny, which automatically cooked and dispensed hotdogs in places such as Grand Central Terminal.

In the early 1950s, Devol licensed his digital magnetic recording device to Remington Rand of Norwalk, Connecticut, and became manager of their magnetics department. There he worked with a team to develop his magnetic recording system for business data applications. He also worked on developing the first high-speed printing systems. While the magnetic recording system proved too slow for business data, Devol's invention was re-purposed as a machine control that would eventually become the "brains" of the Unimate robot.

== The first industrial robot: Unimate ==
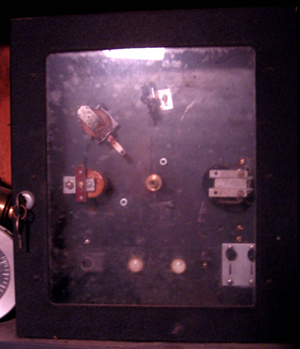
The first static magnetic recorder that used a saw blade to record information

In the 1940s, Devol was focusing on manipulators and his magnetic recording patents, but he took note of the introduction of automation into factories. In 1954, he applied for his robotics patent. U.S. patent 2,988,237, issued in 1961 for Programmed Article Transfer, introduced the concept of universal automation, or Unimation. His wife Evelyn suggested the word "Unimate" to define the product, much the same as George Eastman had coined Kodak.

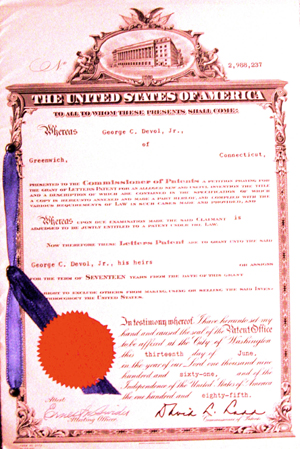
U.S. Patent 2,988,237, issued in 1961 to Devol

Devol wrote that his invention "makes available for the first time a more or less general purpose machine that has universal application to a vast diversity of applications where cyclic digital control is desired."

After applying for this patent Devol searched for a company willing to give him financial backing to develop his programmable articles transfer system. He talked with many major corporations in the United States during his search. Through family connections, Devol obtained an audience with a partner in the firm Manning, Maxwell and Moore in Stratford, Connecticut. Joseph F. Engelberger, chief of engineering in the company's aircraft products division was very interested, and Devol agreed to license his patent and some future patents in the field to the company. But the company was sold that year and its aircraft division was slated to be closed. Engelberger sought a backer to buy out the aircraft division and found one in Consolidated Diesel Electronic (Condec), which agreed to finance the continued development of the robot under a new division, Unimation Incorporated, with Engelberger as its president.

The first Unimate prototypes were controlled by vacuum tubes used as digital switches though later versions used transistors. Most off-the-shelf components available in the late 1950s, such as digital encoders, were inadequate for the Unimate. With Devol's guidance, a team of engineers at Unimation designed and machined practically every part in the first Unimates.

In 1960, Devol personally sold the first Unimate robot, which was shipped in 1961 to General Motors. GM first used the machine for die casting handling and spot welding. The first Unimate robot was installed at GM's Inland Fisher Guide Plant in Ewing Township, New Jersey, in 1961 to lift hot pieces of metal from a die-casting machine and stack them. Soon companies such as Chrysler, Ford, and Fiat saw the necessity for large Unimate purchases.

The company spent about $5 million to develop the first Unimate. In 1966, after many years of market surveys and field tests, full-scale production began in Connecticut. Unimation's first production robot was a material handling robot and was soon followed by robots for welding and other applications.

In 1975, Unimation showed its first profit. In 1978, the PUMA (Programmable Universal Machine for Assembly) robot was developed by Unimation from Vicarm (Victor Scheinman) and with support from General Motors.

In 2005, Popular Mechanics magazine selected Devol's Unimate as one of the Top 50 Inventions of the Past 50 Years.

== Additional work ==
- Elected to honorary member of the Society of Manufacturing Engineers (1985)
- Inducted into the National Inventor's Hall of Fame (2011)
- Member of the Automation Hall of Fame
- Henry Ford and Smithsonian Museum collections both include Unimate robots
- Devol's archives are with the Henry Ford Museum in Dearborn, Michigan

== Death ==
Devol died on August 11, 2011, aged 99, at his home in Wilton, Connecticut. He was survived by two daughters, two sons, five grandchildren and five great-grandchildren. His funeral service was held in a Methodist church and he was laid to rest in Wilton.
