= Unimate =

World's first industrial robot, first produced in 1961

Sketch of a Unimate robot

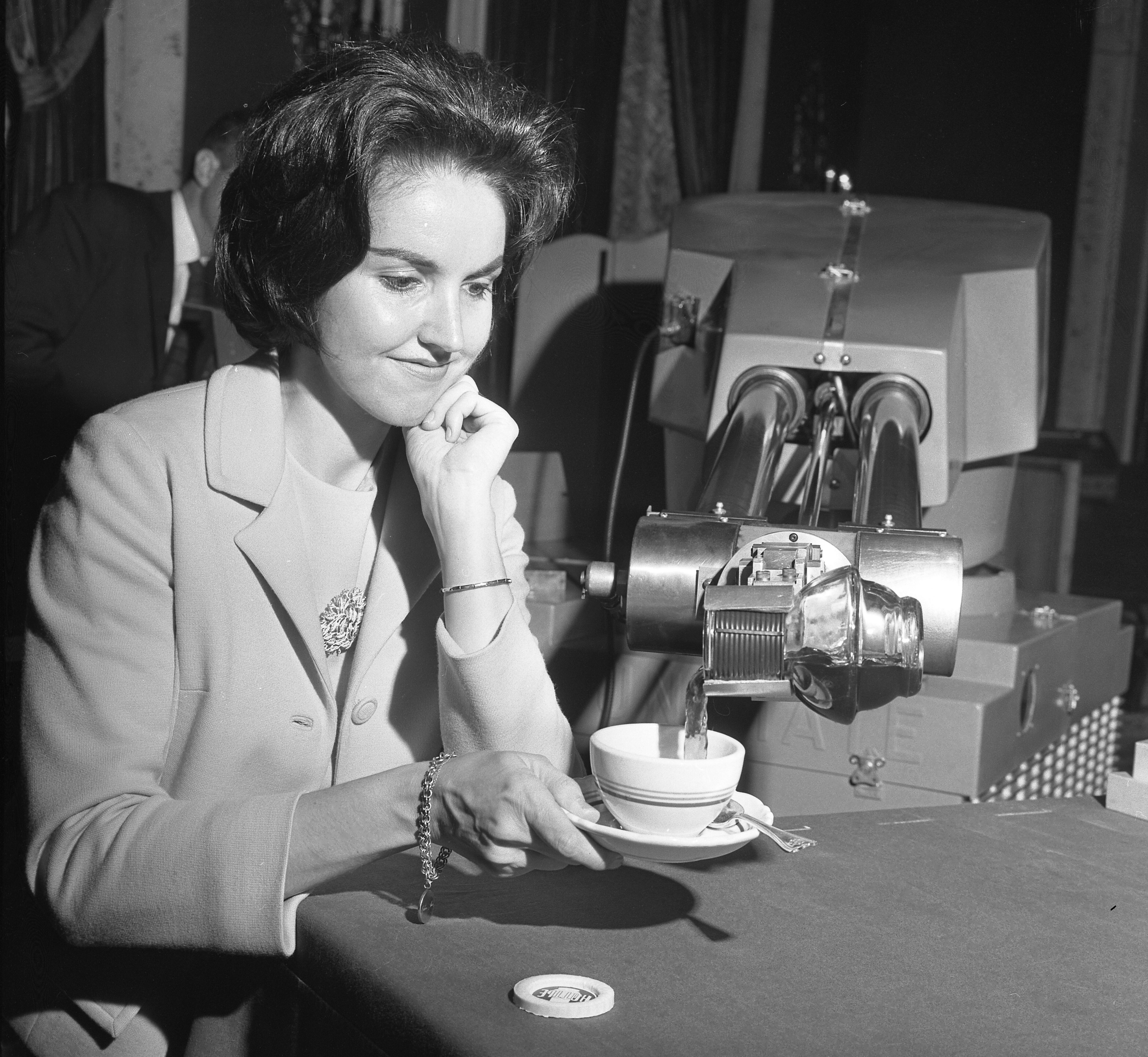
Unimate pouring coffee for a human, 1967

Unimate was the first industrial robot, which worked on a General Motors assembly line at the Inland Fisher Guide Plant in Ewing Township, New Jersey, in 1961. There were in fact a family of robots.

== History ==
It was invented by George Devol in the 1950s using his original patent filed on December 10, 1954 and granted on June 13, 1961 (U.S. patent 2,988,237). The patent is titled "Programmed Article Transfer" (PAT) and begins:

The present invention relates to the automatic operation of machinery, particularly the handling apparatus, and to automatic control apparatus suited for such machinery.

Devol, together with Joseph Engelberger, his business associate, started the world's first robot manufacturing company, Unimation. Devol's background wasn't in academia, but in engineering and mechanics, and previously worked on optical sound recording for film and high-speed printing using magnetic sensing and recording. Engelberger's ultimate goal was to create mechanical workers to replace humans in factories.

The machine weighed 4000 pounds and undertook the job of transporting die castings from an assembly line and welding these parts on auto bodies, a dangerous task for workers, who might be poisoned by toxic fumes or lose a limb if they were not careful.

The original Unimate consisted of a large computer-like box, joined to another box and was connected to an arm, with systematic tasks stored in a drum memory.

In 2003 the Unimate was inducted into the Robot Hall of Fame.

== Technology ==
=== Unimate ===
The 1961 Unimate installed at a General Motors factory differed significantly from George Devol's 1954 patented design. The Unimate was a hydraulically actuated programmable manipulator arm with 5 degrees of freedom. This contrasted with the simpler three-prismatic-link pick-and-place arm described in Devol's "Programmed Article Transfer" (PAT) patent.

=== Devol's patent ===
Devol's earlier methodology, involving the conversion of analog information into electrical signals, formed the basis for subsequent patents. The patent proposed a cost-effective, general-purpose article-handling machine for diverse industrial tasks, with programmable motions, including gripping mechanisms. It would have a wheeled chassis on rails, a base unit housing the movement-recording program drum, an elevator for vertical arm translation, a telescoping arm with a transfer head and gripper, and a three-dimensional position-sensing system using encoders and sensing heads.

The position-sensing system (proprioception) had two versions: one using notched metal strips and ferrous material detection, the other, a magnetized plate with polarity-based sensing and recording. Similarly, the program drum had two forms: a malleable metal sheet with mechanically deformed bulges, and a solid magnetizable drum. Both drum types used corresponding reading mechanisms.

The robot could be programmed by manually moving the gripper, recording the location on the program drum, then it could perform the same motion, an early form of imitation learning. This resulted in point-to-point movement, a standard feature in modern robotic arms. The magnetizable drum also allowed recording continuous movements along curved paths, synchronized with a timing reference for playback.

The fixed encoder array on the base unit served as a location index for recording, enabling deceleration near programmed positions and self-correction during operation.

== In popular culture ==
The Unimate appeared on The Tonight Show hosted by Johnny Carson on which it knocked a golf ball into a cup, poured a beer, waved the orchestra conductor's baton and grasped an accordion and waved it around.

Fictional robots called Unimate, designed by the character Alan von Neumann, Jr., appeared in comic books from DC Comics.
