= EWH =

EWH may refer to:

- Edinburgh World Heritage, an independent charity in Edinburgh, Scotland
- Engineering World Health, a medical and health organization based in Tennessee
- EWH, the Telegraph code for Dingyuan railway station, Chuzhou, Anhui, China
- Exawatt hour (EW h), a unit of energy
