= Micromouse =

Competitive event involving small robotic mice

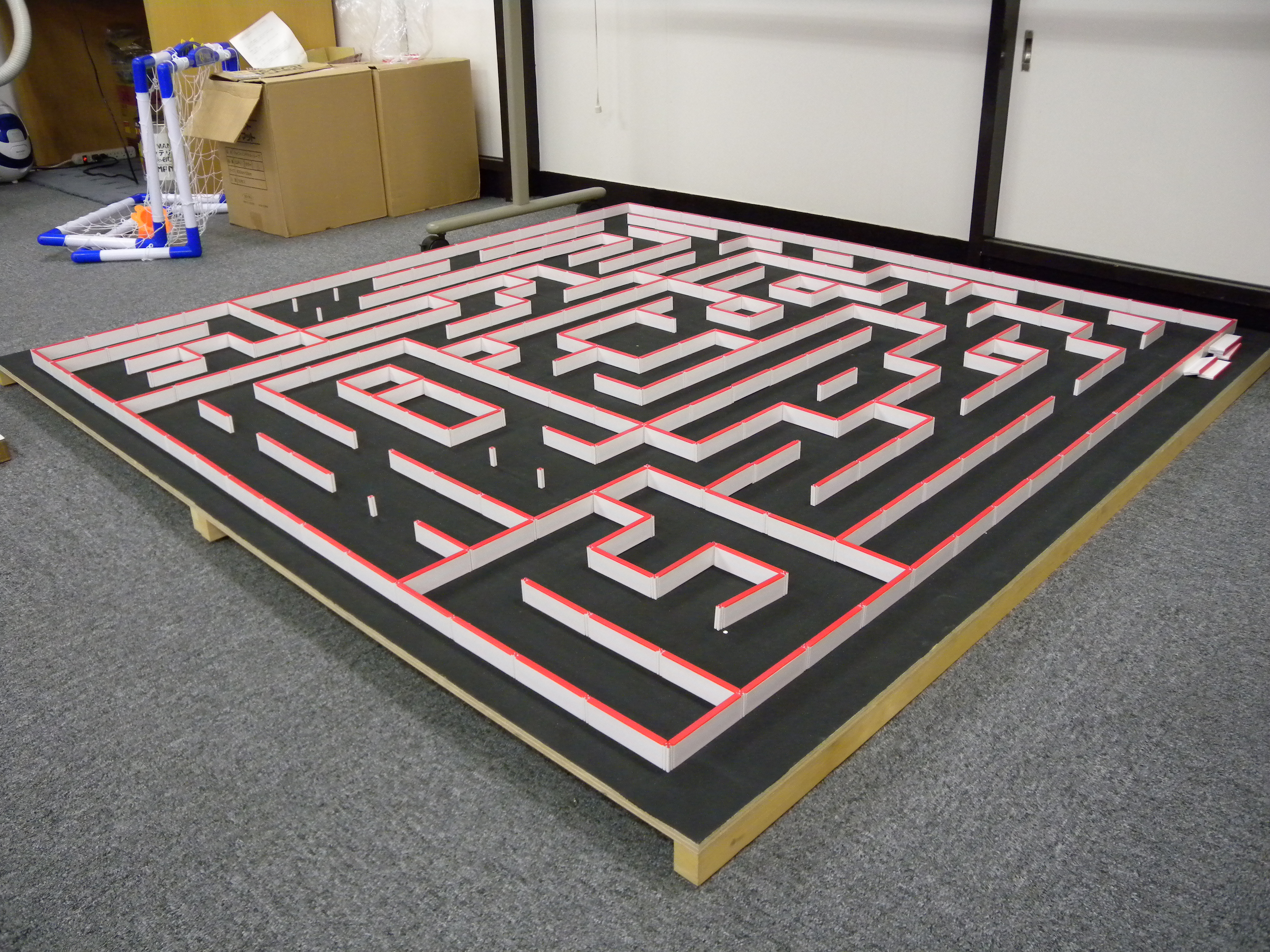
Micromouse maze

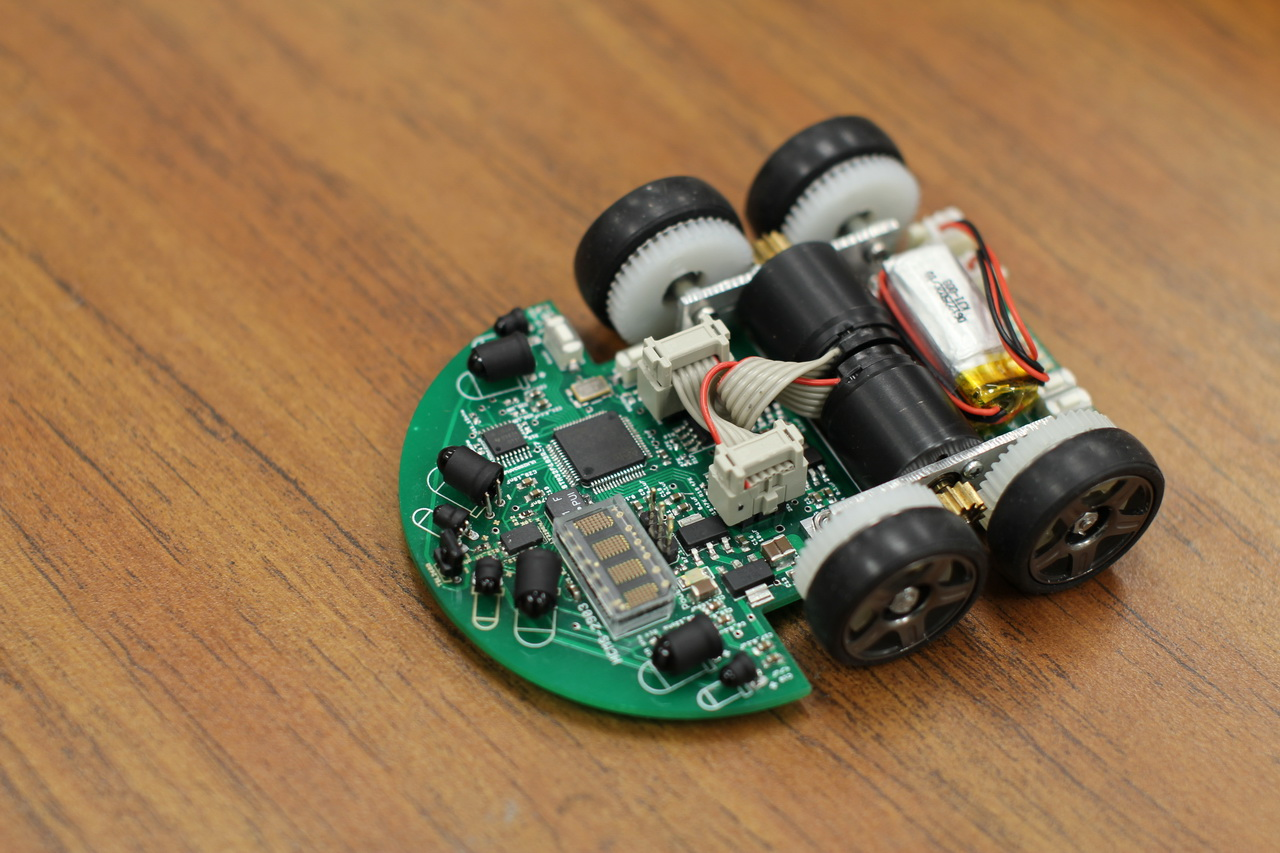
Micromouse robot

Micromouse is an event where small robotic mice compete to solve a 16×16 maze. The first Micromouse event was announced by IEEE Spectrum in 1977 and held in New York City in 1979. Competitions and conferences are run regularly worldwide.

== Rules ==
The maze is made up of a 16×16 grid of cells, each 18 centimetres (7.1 in) square with walls 5 centimetres (2.0 in) high and 1.2 centimetres (0.47 in) thick. The walls are white with red tops, and the floor is black. Mice start at a dead end in one corner, and the goal area is a rectangular room, typically 2×2, in the center of the maze.

The mice are completely autonomous robots that must find their way from a predetermined starting position to the central area of the maze unaided. The mouse needs to keep track of where it is, discover walls as it explores, map out the maze and detect when it has reached the goal. Having reached the goal, the mouse will typically perform additional searches of the maze until it has found an optimal route from the start to the finish. Once the optimal route has been found, the mouse will traverse that route in the shortest achievable time. Up to five runs are permitted per entrant, and sessions are typically limited to 7 or 10 minutes.

The mouse cannot exceed 25 centimetres (9.8 in) in length or width, but there are no height restrictions. Flying, jumping, climbing, and combustion or rocket propulsion are not allowed. Mice can be disqualified for causing damage to the maze. Minor repairs such as cleaning the wheels are permitted while the mouse is at rest, but interventions during a run are not allowed except if the mouse has malfunctioned or crashed, and its computer code and memory about the maze cannot be altered once it is revealed.

=== Half-Size Micromouse ===
A version of Micromouse called the Half-Size Micromouse was introduced at the 30th All Japan Micromouse Competition in 2009. Instead of a 16×16 maze, the Half-Size competition uses up to a 32×32 maze, but cell and wall dimensions have been reduced by half, providing a new challenge.

== Maze solving ==
Mice used in competitions employ the fundamental elements of robot navigation, including mapping, planning, and localization. Additionally, they optimize their path through the maze using various search algorithms. Common search algorithms use variations of the Bellman flood-fill method, Dijkstra's algorithm, A* search algorithm, among various graph traversal and tree traversal algorithms.

== Performance ==
Mice can run at over three meters per second, depending on the maze design. Some of the best micromouse builders are Yusuke Kato, Ng Beng Kiat and Fumitaka Nakashima. The current world record is 3.921 seconds and is held by Ng Beng Kiat.

Moonlight Special was a pioneer in the history of Micromouse and autonomous mobile robots as the first micromouse to demonstrate maze-learning capability. It was described in IEEE Spectrum "Amazing Micro-Mouse Maze Contest" coverage as "the smartest micromouse tested during the contest's four time trials".

Performance in recent years has improved considerably. As of 2015, winning mice are likely to run with forward acceleration and braking well over 1 g. Cornering with centripetal acceleration as high as 2 g is possible. Micromice are among the highest-performing autonomous robots.

Most recently, robots are being equipped with a fan to create a partial vacuum under the mouse while it is running. The additional downforce available has made possible a huge improvement in performance. Compared to a non-fan mouse, the newer robots are likely to be able to achieve centripetal accelerations of 6 g or more. Straight line accelerations can easily exceed 2.5 g.
