= Corinna E. Lathan =

American entrepreneur, engineer, and social activist

Corinna (Cori) E. Lathan
- Education: Swarthmore College; Massachusetts Institute of Technology
- Occupations: Health Care Entrepreneur; Engineer; Neuroscientist
- Title: CEO and Board Chair of AnthroTronix
- Website: https://inventthefuture.tech/

Corinna E. Lathan is an American entrepreneur, engineer, and social activist. She is the author of InventingThe Future: Stories from a Techno Optimist. Lathan is currently CEO of De Oro Devices. She is also the co-founder, and former CEO and board chair of AnthroTronix, Inc., a biomedical research and development company headquartered in Silver Spring, Maryland, USA. Lathan is recognized for her work on digital health software and assistive technology.

== Education ==
Lathan received her B.A. in biopsychology and mathematics from Swarthmore College in Swarthmore, Pennsylvania and concurrent received her M.S. in aeronautics and astronautics and her Doctorate of Neuroscience from MIT in Cambridge, Massachusetts. She was one of two women in her doctoral program.

== Career ==
Lathan was an associate professor of Biomedical Engineering at The Catholic University of America and an Adjunct Associate Professor of Aerospace Engineering at the University of Maryland, College Park. At The Catholic University of America, she was the only woman faculty member in the College of Engineering.

In 1999, Lathan co-founded AnthroTronix, Inc., a research and development company in Silver Spring, Maryland. In 2005, she founded AT KidSystems, Inc., a spinoff of AnthroTronix, which distributed alternative computer interfaces and educational software.

At AnthroTronix, Lathan spearheaded the development of biomedical assistive devices such as CosmoBot, an interactive robot serving children with autism and with disorders that affect the nervous system. In addition, she led the development of Defense Automated Neurobehavioral Assessment (DANA), an FDA-cleared digital health platform which helps healthcare providers better assess cognitive function.

Lathan serves as an independent Director at PTC, a global technology provider for internet of things and augmented reality platforms. She also serves as an independent director at Ekso Bionics, a pioneer in the field of robotic exoskeletons, or wearable robots.

Lathan was named a Technology Pioneer and Young Global Leader by the World Economic Forum and served as the founding co-chair of the Global Futures Council on Human Enhancement.

== Outreach ==
Dedicated to empowering women and minorities in science and technology, Lathan founded Keys to Empowering Youth (KEYs) in 1993 at MIT, which has since been adopted at other universities nationwide.

She has advised the FIRST and VEX robotics programs and is a board member of Engineering World Health, supporting the emergence of healthcare technology in the developing world, the KID Museum, and an advisory board member of the Smithsonian Institution's Lemelson Center for the Study of Invention and Innovation.

Previously, Lathan was an Advisory Board Member of Amman Imman - Water is Life, a judge for Qualcomm Tricorder XPRIZE, and a board member of the National Black Child Development Institute.

== Recognition ==
Lathan's work with children with disabilities and robotics has been featured in magazines including Forbes, Time, and The New Yorker. She was named as Maryland's Top Innovator of the Year, MIT Technology Review's “Top 100 World Innovators,” and one of Fast Company Magazine’s “Most Creative People in Business,” among other recognitions. In March, 2022 a full-size statue of Lathan was featured at the Smithsonian as part of an exhibit of Contemporary Women in STEM.

- The Daily Record Maryland's Top Innovator of the Year (2002)
- MIT Technology Review Top 100 World Innovators (2002)
- World Economic Forum Technology Pioneer (2004)
- World Economic Forum Young Global Leader
- Fast Company Magazine Most Creative People in Business (2010)
