= Moonlight Special Micromouse =

Self-contained autonomous mobile robot

Moonlight Special (with mouse body removed) at the IEEE Spectrum Amazing Micro-Mouse Maze Contest finals, New York, NY, June 1979. From left: Contest Organizer Roger Allan, Art Boland and Ron Dilbeck.

Moonlight Special Micromouse was a self-contained autonomous mobile robot developed in 1978 outside of regular work hours (hence the name "Moonlight Special") by Battelle engineers for entry into the IEEE Spectrum Amazing Micro-Mouse Maze Contest (1978–1979).

The design goal for Moonlight Special was to use a microcomputer to remember where it traveled, using this information to improve its run times on subsequent runs by optimizing the path taken. This goal was achieved during contest time trails in 1978, drawing national media attention (sometimes misspelling the robot's name).

== Technical design ==
Moonlight Special's computing hardware included a Zilog Z80A microprocessor paired with 2 kbytes of erasable PROM program memory and 1 kbyte of maze mapping RAM memory, plus a Programmable Input/Output (PIO) chip and a Counter/Timer Circuit (CTC) chip. The PIO interface controlled two stepper motors and received inputs from five photodiode optical sensors. Two sensors kept the robot's path centered to avoid wall contact. Three additional optical sensors detected maze walls and openings in the left/forward/right directions. All optical sensor infrared LED light sources were modulated to improve immunity to bright exhibit lighting. A constant 4 kHz clock interrupt routine handled motor control outputs and sensor inputs.

A modernized functional diagram of Moonlight Special software architecture

The four-level background loop responded to sensor readings and was responsible for X-Y coordinate dead reckoning, navigation decisions, maze mapping, and shortest path race optimization. The robot's four maneuvers included: turn left, go straight, turn right, and turn around. All software was coded in Z80 assembly language and cross-compiled by a Digital Equipment Corporation PDP-11/70 minicomputer.

The robot's custom frame, wheels, and mechanical assembly were fabricated out of stainless steel and aluminum, with gear reduction to increase stepper motor torque. Small brass hobby tubing supported sensors and the microprocessor circuit board. Two rechargeable battery packs provided 25 minutes of on-board power; 5V for the Z80 and sensors, and 12V for motors and LEDs. Two toggle switches were used during competition; a top-mounted run/stop switch that started/stopped forward motion, and a rear-mounted 3-position switch that selected the navigation mode (Solve, Map, Race).

== Maze mapping and optimization ==
Moonlight Special's maze mapping and race optimization software logic were based on graph theory and publications by Gaston Tarry and Niklaus Wirth. Tarry's algorithm (1895) was the basis for efficiently exploring a completely unknown contest maze. During exploration a virtual maze was constructed in robot memory as an undirected connected graph with the robot's traveled distances between nodes (maze intersections) recorded, along with node coordinates, at both ends of explored links between nodes. Node data structure accommodated links in four compass directions (N/W/S/E, 4-way intersections) relative to the maze entrance. This software was developed using a FORTRAN simulation prior to translation to Z80 assembly language.

The contest rules allowed each robot three consecutive runs to try to improve its elapsed time by learning the shortest path through the maze. Moonlight Special leveraged each run for different but complimentary purposes. All three runs used Tarry's algorithm for maze traversal. To appear more mouse-like, the robot made random decisions when multiple unexplored node exit links were present. The first (Solve) run found the unknown coordinates and compass direction of the maze exit link, mapping each link and node traversed during the search, creating a partial maze map with any dead-end links encountered blocked at their entrances with virtual walls. The second (Map) run started with the exit link virtually blocked, forcing a complete exploration and mapping of the maze that ended with the robot returning to the maze entrance. Dead-end links found during the first run were skipped and any new dead-end links found were virtually blocked during the mapping. At the beginning of the third (Race) run the virtual exit link block was removed and the mathematically shortest path was computed through the remaining open links and nodes from entrance to exit. Additional virtual link-blocking walls were added to the maze map, leaving only the shortest path links open at the beginning of the third run. This optimization was accomplished using the "backtracking" algorithm described by Niklaus Wirth in 1976, which is considered a form of depth-first search.

== Contest time trials 1978 ==
In 1978 over 6000 contest registrations were received, and four time trials were held during technical conferences. Moonlight Special competed in the first two time trials, demonstrating its maze learning capability for two differently designed undisclosed mazes.

The robot's first successful maze learning demonstration was in Anaheim California during the 1978 National Computer Conference (NCC) in June 1978, with a 40-second third run after a light shield was installed over its optical sensors, becoming the first micromouse to demonstrate maze learning.

The robot's second maze learning demonstration was during the Western Electronic Show and Convention (WESCON) in August 1978 in Los Angeles California. Moonlight Special raced the shortest path though the maze on its third run in a "sizzling 51.4 seconds," with improved optical sensors and a new mouse-like fiberglass body. This was its final configuration in preparation for the 1979 finals in New York City. Moonlight Special was described in IEEE Spectrum Amazing Micro-Mouse Maze Contest coverage as "the smartest micromouse tested during the contest's four time trials".

== Contest finals 1979 ==
The Amazing Micro-Mouse Contest final races at the June 1979 National Computer Conference (NCC) in New York City attracted a crowd of spectators, reporters and television crews from CBS, NBC and ABC. Information pioneer Dr. Claude Shannon was a special guest.

Moonlight Special demonstrated its learning capability for the third time for a third different unknown maze to race the shortest path through the finals contest maze in 50.38 seconds, finishing second in the learning category. A faster version of Moonlight Special named Moonlight Express from the Battelle team raced the shortest path in 31.16 seconds. It won the learning category prize, using the same optical sensors, with identical maze navigation, mapping and optimization code. A non-intelligent wall following robot named Moonlight Flash from the Battelle team won the fastest mouse award, finishing in 29.78 seconds using optical wall sensors. Moonlight Special received recognition as the subject of a technical paper describing its design, judged best personal computing paper from among more than 300 entries.

None of the other fifteen micromice invited to the event were able to analyze the finals maze and race the shortest path. Moonlight Special and Moonlight Express achieved the contest's objective to build a self-contained thinking mouse that could find its way through an unknown maze, learn from its mistakes, and solve the maze in subsequent runs. By comparison, Moonlight Special maze-solving predecessor Theseus and contemporary room-navigating robot Stanford Cart were not self-contained, relying on external computing resources.

National coverage of the contest results continued in newspapers and magazines, mentioning Moonlight Special by name and often with an accompanying photo. As recently as 2014 IEEE Spectrum recapped micromouse history using the familiar double-exposure photograph of Moonlight Special, the first micromouse to demonstrate maze learning capability.

Micromouse competition continued worldwide, next in 1980 in London during the EUROMICRO event. A revised maze design was introduced that had a known central goal location and a specific starting location orientation. This excluded wall following entries but also changed the unknown maze aspect of the original contest, eliminating the need to discover the goal coordinates, and opening up additional Micromouse maze-solving algorithm options such as Flood fill. Moonlight Special and Moonlight Express did not compete in 1980.
