= Robert Malkin =

Robert A. Malkin PhD, PE
- Born: Cleveland, Ohio, U.S.
- Occupations: Biomedical engineer, academic
- Known for: Pratt Pouch; Engineering World Health
- Awards: Imhoff Distinguished Teaching Award (2010); IEEE Spectrum Engineering Hero (2015)

Academic background
- Education: B.S. University of Michigan, 1984; M.S. Duke University, 1990; Ph.D. Duke University, 1993
- Alma mater: University of Michigan; Duke University
- Thesis: (1993)

Academic work
- Discipline: Biomedical engineering
- Sub-discipline: Medical instrumentation; global health
- Institutions: City College of New York; University of Memphis / University of Tennessee; Duke University
- Main interests: Medical devices for low-resource settings, HIV prevention, biomedical equipment repair
- Notable works: Medical Instrumentation in the Developing World (2006)
- Website: dhtlab.pratt.duke.edu/people/robert-malkin

Robert A. Malkin is an engineer and academic whose work focuses on medical instrumentation for low- and middle-income countries. He is a professor of the practice emeritus of biomedical engineering and professor of the practice of global health at Duke University, and an affiliate of the Duke Initiative for Science & Society. In 2015, IEEE Spectrum named him among its Today's Engineering Heroes.

== Career ==
Before graduate school, Malkin worked in industry across several countries. He designed integrated circuits at EM Microelectronics in Switzerland, designed pacemakers at Cordis Corporation, and worked on heart-lung machines at Sarns Incorporated. He also spent time teaching English in Thailand.

After completing his doctorate, Malkin joined the faculty at City College of New York as a professor of electrical engineering and a member of the graduate faculty of the City University of New York, with a research affiliation at Columbia University. He later moved to Memphis, Tennessee, where he held the Herbert Herff Professorship of Biomedical Engineering at the joint biomedical engineering program of the University of Memphis and the University of Tennessee.

In 2004, Malkin left the endowed chair to take a non-tenure-track position at his doctoral alma mater, Duke University, where he has remained since. He has held a joint appointment at the Duke Global Health Institute since 2011 and became a professor of the practice emeritus in the Department of Biomedical Engineering at Duke's Pratt School of Engineering in 2021.

His research has been funded by the National Institutes of Health, the American Heart Association, the Whitaker Foundation, the National Science Foundation, and Engineering World Health, among others. He has published in the field of cardiac defibrillation and wrote Medical Instrumentation in the Developing World (2006), a textbook widely used in global health engineering programs.

== Pratt Pouch ==
The Pratt Pouch is a small foil-and-polyethylene sachet that holds a single pre-measured dose of liquid antiretroviral drugs for newborns. The device was developed in response to a practical gap in HIV prevention: roughly half of all births worldwide happen at home, often far from any clinic. A mother can bring home a supply of the pre-filled pouches before delivery and squeeze one into her infant's mouth in the hours after birth, without needing to measure a dose herself.

The stakes are significant. Without any intervention, the risk of mother-to-child HIV transmission can reach 45 percent; antiretroviral therapy given at delivery can bring that figure below five percent. The pouch preserves medication at room temperature for up to twelve months and costs roughly four cents to produce.

The device was developed by Malkin and students in Duke's Developing World Healthcare Technologies Lab and takes its name from the Pratt School of Engineering. The first clinical trials were run at Hospital Gineco-Obstetrico Enrique C. Sotomayor in Guayaquil, Ecuador. Field studies followed in Tanzania, Zambia, and Uganda. A trial in southern Zambia found that antiretroviral access for infants born outside health facilities rose from 35 percent before the pouch was introduced to 94 percent afterward. Across field sites, dosing accuracy improved from around 50 percent with conventional medicine bottles to around 90 percent with the pouch. In Uganda, the Elizabeth Glaser Pediatric AIDS Foundation, with funding from the Bill & Melinda Gates Foundation and the Saving Lives at Birth program, scaled up distribution with a target of reaching 40,000 HIV-positive mothers.

In 2012, the World Health Organization included the Pratt Pouch on its list of the ten most innovative health technologies for low-resource settings. The pouch is distributed internationally by Maternova.

== Organizations ==
Malkin co-founded Engineering World Health (EWH) in Memphis, Tennessee in 2001 alongside engineering colleague Mohammad Kiani. The two had traveled together on cardiac surgery trips to hospitals in the developing world and wanted a more systematic way for engineers to contribute. When Malkin moved to Duke in 2004, EWH moved with him and set up its headquarters in Durham, North Carolina. The organization runs a summer institute that places university-level engineering students in hospitals in Central America, Southeast Asia, and Africa, and has established accredited biomedical equipment technician (BMET) training programs in Rwanda, Honduras, Cambodia, and Nigeria in partnership with local educational institutions and ministries of health.

In 2009, Malkin founded the Global Public Service Academies (GPSA), a program that places high school students in clinical settings in Central America. He also founded the International Research Institute of North Carolina, which gives secondary school students access to research experiences.

== Education and honors ==
Malkin was born in Cleveland, Ohio. He earned two bachelor's degrees from the University of Michigan in 1984, followed by a master's degree in 1990 and a PhD in electrical engineering in 1993, both from Duke University.

He is a fellow of the American Institute for Medical and Biological Engineering and has served as an advisor to WHO committees on health care technology. Duke's Pratt School of Engineering gave him its Imhoff Distinguished Teaching Award in 2010. In 2015, IEEE Spectrum featured him as one of its Engineering Heroes.
