= Wall-following =

Wall-following may refer to:

- Wall-following, a thigmotaxis behavior
- Wall-following, a maze-solving algorithm ("Hand On Wall Rule")
