= Engineering World Health =

- Founded: 2001, Memphis, Tennessee
- Purpose: Clinical engineering
- Region served: Global
- Website: ewh.org

Engineering World Health (EWH) was a non-profit organization that worked with hospitals and clinics that serve resource-poor communities of the developing world. EWH has now merged with Engineers Without Borders - USA. EWH's focus was on the repair and maintenance of medical equipment and on building local capacity to manage and maintain the equipment without international aid.

Engineering professors Robert Malkin and Mohammad Kiani established EWH in Memphis in 2001. In 2004, Dr. Malkin and EWH relocated to Duke University, which has been an active partner since that time. As a result of this partnership, EWH is headquartered in Durham, NC. In 2008, EWH received a multi-year grant from the Wallace H. Coulter Foundation.

== Activities ==
=== Summer & January Institutes ===
Engineering World Health's signature program is the Summer & January Institutes. These service abroad programs engage university-level science and engineering students to use their skills and knowledge to make a direct impact on hospitals in developing countries. Participants spend three to nine weeks in Uganda, Rwanda, Tanzania, Guatemala, Cambodia, or Nepal learning hands-on technical skills and the local language, and then working in local hospitals to install, repair, and maintain medical equipment. Participants also train local staff, empowering them to use and maintain equipment, to create lasting improvements in partner hospitals.

Since 2004, over 1,200 participants have repaired almost 13,200 pieces of hospital equipment, worth an estimated US$26 million.

=== BMET Training Program ===
Seeking a sustainable solution to hospital equipment repair, Engineering World Health started a biomedical equipment technician (BMET) training program in late 2009, in partnership with the GE Foundation. Through a three to four year curriculum tailored to each country's needs, EWH works with a local educational institution and Ministry of Health to train BMETs to international standards, train local teachers to carry on the program in the long term, and establish a permanent, accredited BMET training program.

The first BMET Training program began in Rwanda, and has since placed trained BMETs in every district in the country. Thanks to further funding from the GE Foundation, EWH has completed a training program Honduras and turned it over to local leadership, and, as of 2016, is training BMETs in Cambodia, Nigeria, and Ethiopia.

=== BMET Library ===
In 2016, EWH launched an open-source digital library for BMETs, with the goal of facilitating and fostering information exchange among engineers and technicians around the world. This library is a collection of open source books and publications containing information useful for training (BMETs), particularly in the developing countries where EWH is working.

=== Other programs ===
In the summer of 2021, EWH offered a free virtual design program for students in the United States, Lebanon and Jordan. The program, titled Virtual Engineering Innovation and Cultural Exchange, was focused on healthcare design in low-resource settings. It was sponsored by the Stevens Initiative, a project funded by the United States Department of State, Bezos Family Foundation, and the Governments of Morocco and the United Arab Emirates, and administered by the Aspen Institute.

== Organization ==
=== Board of directors ===
As of 2021, the EWH's board of directors is made up of the following:

- Michael R. Tracy, PhD - Ethicon (Chair)
- Jessica Feddersen, CPA - Danaher Corporation (Treasurer)
- Mhoire Murphy, MBA - McKinsey & Company (Secretary)
- Sreeram Dhurjaty, PhD - Dhurjaty Electronics Consulting
- William E. Gannon, Jr., MD, MBA - Capital City Technical Consulting
- Mark Goldman, MBA - Philips Healthcare
- Barbara Grenell, PhD - Preferred Health Strategies, Ltd.
- Mohammad Kiani, PhD, FAHA - Temple University
- Corinna E. Lathan, PhD, PE - AnthroTronix, Inc.
- Eric Nodiff, JD - Schaeffer Venaglia Handler & Fitzsimons, LLP
- Cathy Peck, CPA - Professor, Fresno Pacific University
- Tojan B. Rahhal, PhD - Engineering World Health (Ex oficio)
- Robert Malkin, PhD, PE - Duke University (Emeritus)
- Lynn Toby Fisher, JD (In memoriam)

=== Chapters ===
Engineering World Health has student chapters at 45 universities around the world. These Chapters engage students in activities as design projects for the developing world, biomedical equipment repair and evaluation, and raising awareness of global health challenges. Chapters may also get involved in the EWH Design Competition in which teams of engineering students submit a design directed at the needs of developing country healthcare. The top three teams are selected by an independent panel of judges and are then rewarded with cash prizes, giving them a chance to implement their device.

==== US chapters ====
- Arizona State University
- Binghamton University
- Boston University
- California Polytechnic State University, San Luis Obispo
- Case Western Reserve University
- Catholic University of America
- Clemson University
- Cornell University
- Duke University
- Elon University
- George Washington University
- Georgia Tech
- Johns Hopkins University
- LeTourneau University
- Michigan Tech University
- North Carolina State University
- Northeastern University
- Northwestern University
- Purdue University
- Rochester Institute of Technology
- Santa Clara University
- St. Philip's College
- SUNY at Buffalo
- SUNY Jefferson
- Syracuse University
- University of Arkansas
- University of Bridgeport
- University of Buffalo
- University of California, Berkeley
- University of California, San Diego
- University of Connecticut
- University of Florida
- University of Illinois Chicago
- University of Kentucky
- University of Maryland, College Park
- University of Minnesota, Twin Cities
- University of Missouri
- University of North Carolina
- University of Portland
- University of Rochester
- University of Texas at Arlington
- University of Texas at Austin
- University of Texas at Dallas
- University of Vermont
- University of Wisconsin
- Vanderbilt University
- Virginia Commonwealth University
- Virginia Tech
- Washington and Lee University
- Washington University in St. Louis
- Western New England University

==== International chapters ====
- Aalborg University (Denmark)
- Arusha Technical College
- Chung Yuan Christian University (Taiwan)
- Instituto Tecnológico y de Estudios Superiores de Monterrey
- Integrated Polytechnic Regional College (IPRC)
- Lovely Professional University
- Makerere University (Uganda)
- McMaster University
- National Autonomous University of Mexico
- Pontifical Catholic University of Peru
- Technical University of Denmark
- University College Dublin (Ireland)
- University of Auckland
- University of Canterbury
- University of Ghana
- University of New South Wales
- University of Queensland
- University of Science and Technology, Yemen
- University of Sheffield
- University of Toronto
- University of Twente

== Partners ==
EWH's program and funding partners as of August 2022 include:

- Aspen Institute
- Association for the Advancement of Medical Instrumentation
- Australian Aid
- Biomedical Engineering Society
- Cantel Medical Corporation
- Danaher Corporation
- Duke University Health System
- Ethicon
- Flemming Topsøe
- George Mason University
- Illinois Institute of Technology
- Makerere University
- MedShare
- National Instruments
- Notre Dame University–Louaize
- Rochester Institute of Technology
- Rose–Hulman Institute of Technology
- Technical University of Denmark
- Texas A&M University
- United Way
- University of New South Wales
- Vontier
- Wallace H. Coulter Foundation

Former partners include Abbott Laboratories, BD, Biogen, Coca-Cola Company, General Electric, Lagos University Teaching Hospital, McKesson Corporation, the Nigerian Ministry of Health and St. Jude Children's Research Hospital.
