= KID Museum =

Child-oriented maker space in Bethesda, MD

Coordinates: 39°1′23″N 77°7′44″W

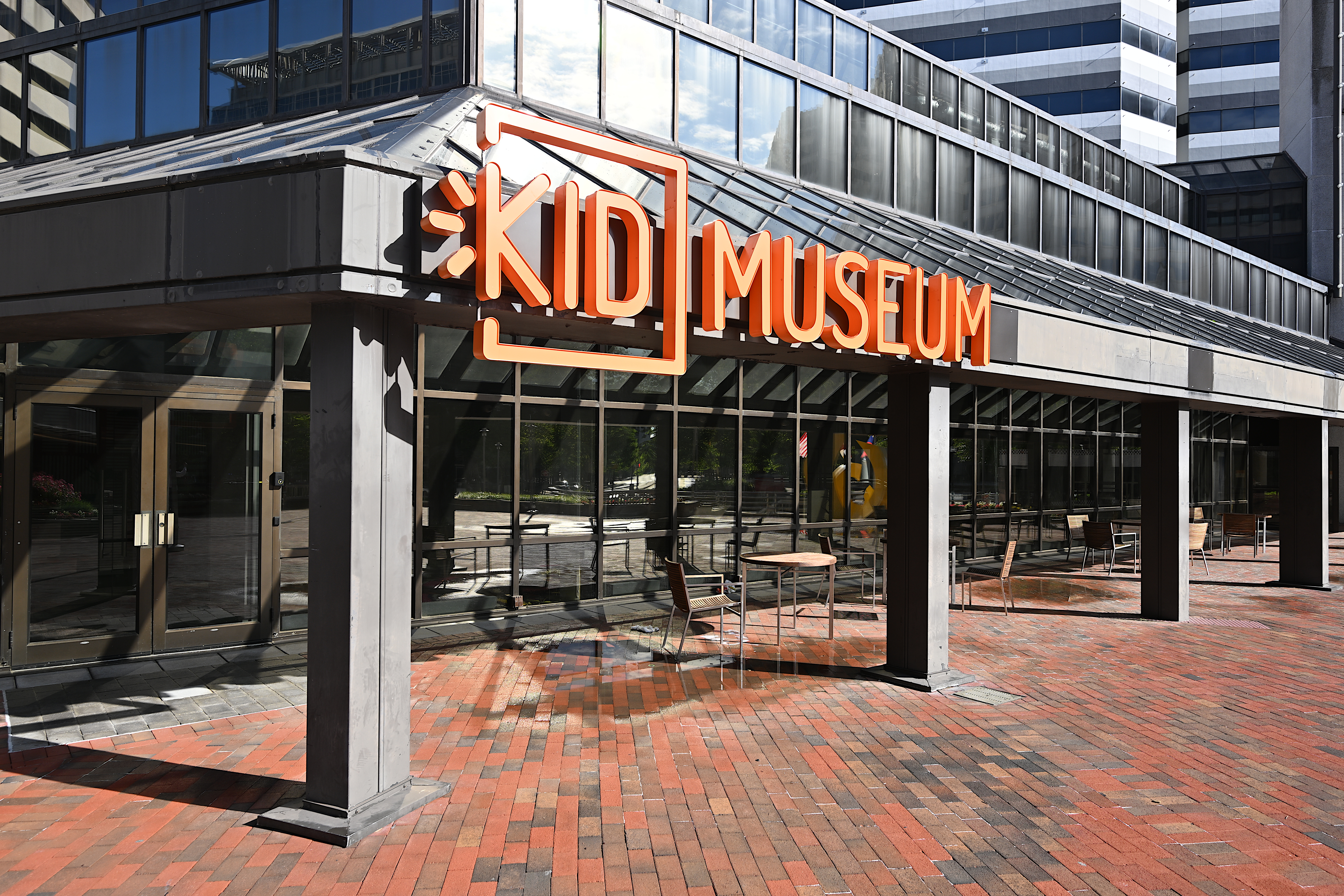
KID Museum entrance at Bethesda Metro Center

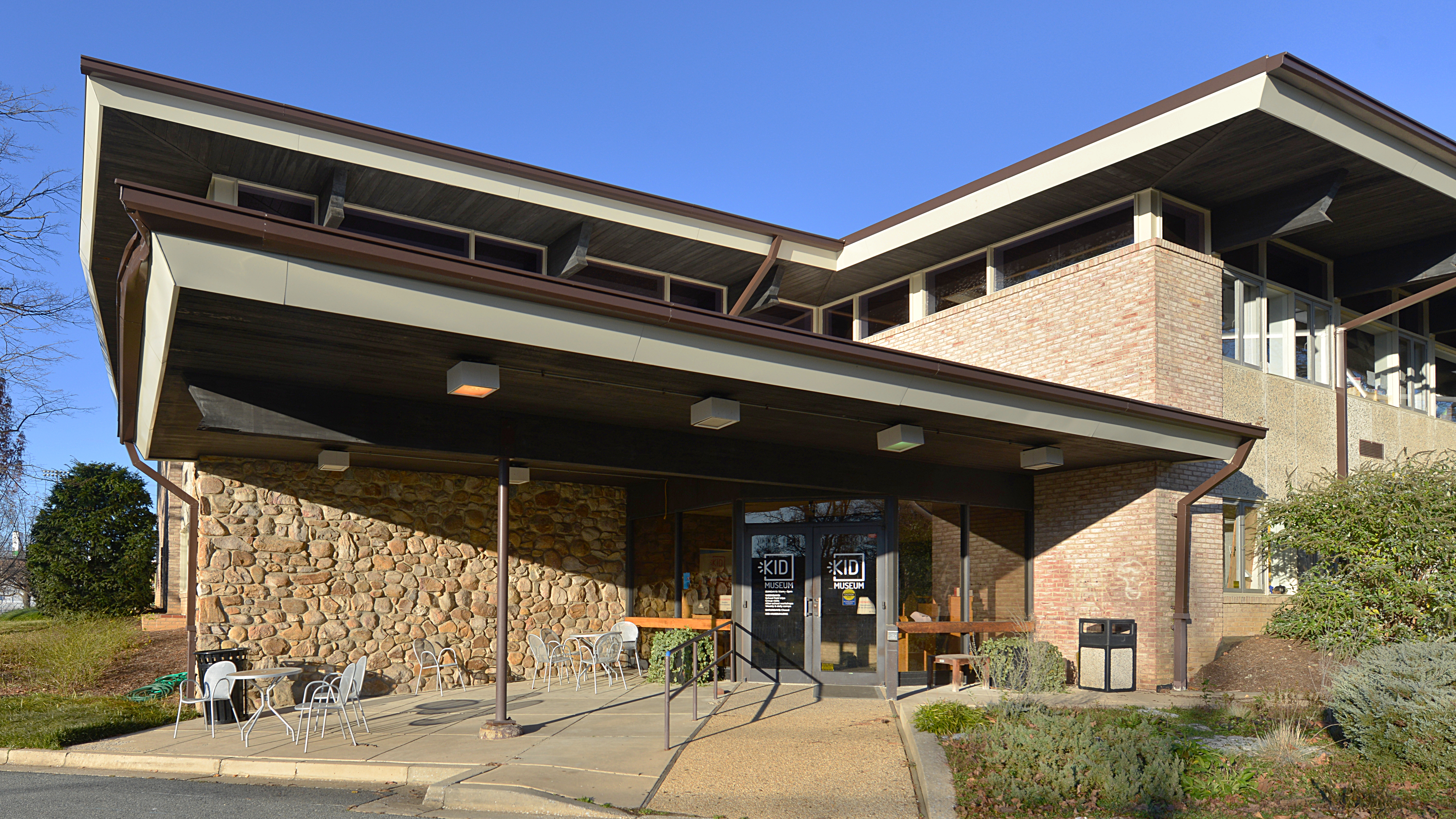
Entrance to the KID Museum at Davis Library in Bethesda, MD

KID Museum (Kids’ Innovation & Discovery) is a children's museum and child-oriented maker space in the Washington, D.C. suburb of Bethesda, Maryland.

In May 2022, KID Museum opened a new location in Downtown Bethesda that provides a larger space for activities ranging from wood shop to robotics. The new space is nearly four times the size of the old space on the lower floor of Bethesda's Davis Library which remains open for some programming. More than 330,000 people have visited the KID Museum since it opened in 2014.

The Washington Post said "The museum’s hands-on programs teach skills such as collaboration, creativity and critical thinking, as well as such technical skills as designing and building and even using power tools."
