= IEEE Spectrum =

Magazine edited by the Institute of Electrical and Electronics Engineers

- Front cover of the January 2022 issue
- Editor: Harry Goldstein
- Categories: Electrical engineering
- Circulation: 380,000
- Publisher: Institute of Electrical and Electronics Engineers
- First issue: January 1964
- Country: United States
- Based in: New York City, New York
- Website: spectrum.ieee.org
- ISSN: 0018-9235

IEEE Spectrum is a magazine edited and published by the Institute of Electrical and Electronics Engineers.

The first issue of IEEE Spectrum was published in January 1964 as a successor to Electrical Engineering.

In 2010, IEEE Spectrum was the recipient of Utne Reader magazine's Utne Independent Press Award for Science/Technology Coverage. In 2012, IEEE Spectrum was selected as the winner of the National Magazine Awards "General Excellence Among Thought Leader Magazines" category.
