= Robot economics =

Robot economics is the study of the market for robots. Robot markets function through the interaction of robot makers and robot users. As (in part) a factor of production, robots are complements and/or substitutes for other factors, such as labor and (non-robot) capital goods. Another part of robot economics considers the effects of the introduction of robots on the markets for those other factors and on the products that robots help produce.

Robots are spreading throughout the economy, in fields such as agriculture, medicine and retail.

== Markets ==
=== Agriculture ===
The use of robots in agriculture began with automated milking systems. More recently, agricultural robots have begun to be used in harvesting, pruning, seeding, spraying and materials handling.

=== Medicine ===
Medical robots can be categorized in five segments: surgery, rehabilitation, non-invasive radiosurgery, hospital and pharmacy and others. Robot-assisted surgery can improve accuracy. However, medical robots can increase costs.

The market was valued at $1,781 million in 2013. Hospital and pharmacy robots segment grew fastest.

=== Retail ===
Robots can be used in retail for helping customers find items, keep track of product inventory on shelves, and even interact with customers.

== Manufacturers ==
Major participants operating in the global robotic market include Samsung Electronics, iRobot, Toyota Motor Corporation, AB Electrolux, Hanool Robotics, Fujitsu Frontech Limited, LG Electronics, Fujitsu, Sony Corporation, Yujin Robot and GeckoSystems.
