= Roborior =

Robot

Roborior is a robot manufactured by the robotics company Tmsuk and marketed by Sanyo. It is used both for lighting and guarding homes. Roborior is roughly the size of a watermelon and can produce different hues of color ranging from blue, purple, and orange. The Roborior is also equipped with a digital video camera that can stream live video directly to the owner's cell phone if it detects an intruder. The Roborior can be controlled remotely with a hand set, much like a Remote control vehicle, as well. It was introduced in Japan in late 2005 and was priced at 280,000 Japanese yen. The name is a portmanteau of robot and interior.
