= Cyclone Mark V Engine =

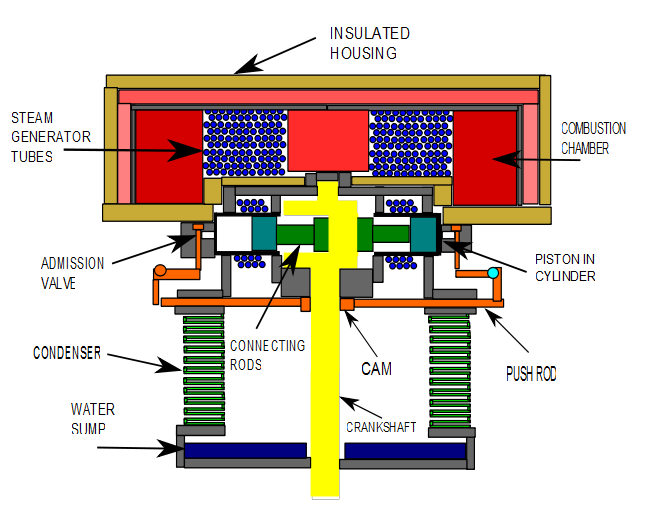
Cross Section of Cyclone Mark V Engine.

The Cyclone Mark V Engine is a steam engine in which the engine, steam generator, condenser and feed pump are integrated into a single compact unit. The company Cyclone Power Technologies of Pompano Beach, Florida was founded by inventor Harry Schoell to develop and market this engine. The Cyclone Mark V Engine is a six cylinder radial uniflow engine of two inch bore and two inch stroke. Pistons are single acting. The engine is claimed to produce 100 hp at 3,600 rpm using steam at 3,200 psi and 1,200 °F.

== Timeline ==
Date	Event
Sep 13, 2005	Harry Schoell files for U.S. Patent "Heat regenerative engine" on what will become known as the Cyclone Mark V Engine.
April 2008	Popular Science Magazine named the cyclone engine Invention of The Year. No engine had yet been built.
July 30, 2009	First two Mark V engines are sold to customer Phoenix Power Group LLC of Tennessee with a quoted delivery time of six months. The contract required that "The Mark V engine shall produce approximately 92hp" and that "The final working prototype engine will have been thoroughly tested by continuously running the engine at a minimum of ¾ power for 7 consecutive days". The contract contained a late delivery penalty clause of $25,000 per month if engines were not delivered within nine months.
December 9, 2009	Cyclone Power Technologies promises a high performance Mark V engine to Chuk Williams who was building a race car to break the land speed record for steam-powered cars.
December 11, 2009	A license is provided to Great Wall Alternative Power Systems Ltd, to produce Mark V engines for the China market. Technology was to be transferred "Upon the completion by Cyclone Power Technologies of its initial pre-production prototype Mark V engine in the United States, anticipated to be in mid to late 2010".
October 18, 2010	Contract with Phoenix Power Group amended to substitute the delivery of two "WHE-25" (a small, simple steam engine) for the two Mark V engines in the original contract. However, the contract continues to state "Cyclone continues to use its best efforts to deliver two Mark V working prototype engines to Phoenix as soon as possible."
April, 2011	The Raytheon company orders "multiple" Mark V engines. Two engines were delivered to Raytheon in June 2012, although the delivered engines were "MantaRay 36" engines rather than Mark Vs. The MantaRay engine did not have the burner, steam generator, condenser or combustion air preheaters of the Mark V engine. There has been no news of these engines since the announcement of that delivery.
May, 2011	Cyclone Power Technologies builds a speedboat, the 'GG Mom', to break the water speed record for steam-powered boats using the Mark V engine. Although they state record attempts will be made that summer, the boat never appears to have been run.
September 12, 2011	The Combilift corporation in Ireland orders two Mark V engines. The contract specifies the engines will be "Run at Cyclone for a minimum of 50 hours prior to delivery to Combilift". Delivery was to be in July, 2012.
March 23, 2012	After numerous delays in the promised delivery of the Mark V engine for the land speed car, Chuk Williams announces the collaboration with Cyclone has ended. Chuk obtains a steam engine and runs his car on the Bonneville Salt Flats in October, 2012
April 2012	The contracted engines were not yet delivered to Phoenix Power group and "As of April 2012, the maximum $400,000 contracted penalty has been provided" for the late delivery.
January 2, 2013	James Landon, CEO of Cyclone Power Technologies issues Letter to Shareholders and states: "To assist us in moving this project towards completion, we have recruited contractors with expertise in certain areas such as condensing systems. We are confident that we can start delivery of engines to our customer in the first half of 2013.
February 2013	James Landon resigns as CEO and Director of Cyclone Power Technologies. There is no further mention of contractors assisting in overcoming development problems with the Mark V engine.
September 2013	Great Wall Alternative Power Systems terminates Mark V engine license agreement with Cyclone Power Technologies.
September 30, 2013	Contract with Phoenix Power Group amended to say "No other engines including the Mark V engines, other than as specifically stated herein, are required to be delivered", ending the order from Phoenix for Mark V engines.
January 2, 2015	Cyclone Power Technologies reports "Our R&D team is moving towards completion of the Mark 5 project in Quarter 1 of 2015. These engines are to be delivered to Combilift for use as a clean-burning power supply in material lift equipment."
February 23, 2015	Cyclone Power Technologies posts a video of the Mark V engine undergoing testing. This engine differs considerably from previous descriptions of the Mark V. In particular: There is a large automotive radiator and fan mounted externally to the engine acting as a condenser rather than the integral condenser that was the subject of US patent 7798204.; There is no preheating of the combustion air. (See Schoell Cycle below.); The admission valve system has changed from a cam and linkage operated poppet valve on each cylinder head to a central rotary valve. The cam and linkage valve control mechanism was the subject of US patents 7730873 and 7784280; This version of the engine is not protected by the basic Cyclone Power Technologies engine patents US 7856822 and 7080512 (as well a variety of similar patents in other countries) because the patents only cover an engine with an integral condenser and that preheats combustion air. The version of the Mark V engine in this video does not have these features.

== Functional description ==
The Cyclone Engine is built of three major components, the Steam Generator, Piston Block, and Condenser. The working fluid, deionized water, travels continuously through these three components. Beginning in the steam generator, moving into the pistons, then to the condenser, and finally pumped back into the steam generator.

=== Steam generator ===
Steam Generator has three basic components: a coil of water tubes, surrounded by a series of burner assemblies, and covered with an insulated shroud. Each burner assembly consists of an air blower, which blows pre-heated air into the combustion chamber, a fuel atomizer, and an igniter. The blower and atomizer are arranged so that the flame front is tangential to the water-tube coils. Cyclone Power Technologies claims this arrangement allows the heavier particles in the fuel to circle the outside of the chamber until they are completely burned up, allowing for much cleaner, complete combustion of fuel, and resulting in cleaner emissions. However, they have not performed any testing to verify this theory.

The small size of the water tubes allows for much higher pressures than those of larger boilers, because of this, the water is not allowed to boil. Instead, it is allowed to reach supercritical temperature of up to 1,200 °F.

=== Piston assembly ===
The piston assembly is an even number of pistons arranged radially around a single crankshaft. The pistons are attached to the crankshaft via a special "spider" bearing. This bearing consists of several small journal bearings attached to a disk which has a larger crankshaft journal bearing in the center. Each piston has one head admission valve. This valve is actuated by a variable cam on the crankshaft, and allows for the entrance of supercritical water into the cylinder. As the supercritical water enters the cylinder it flashes into steam and pushes the piston inward, thus rotating the crankshaft.

As the piston is pushed inward, it uncovers exhaust ports in the cylinder wall. The supercritical water has now given up enough energy through expansion that it is in a vapor state. This exhaust vapor passes out of the exhaust ports in the cylinder wall and across regenerative heating coils, which are wrapped around the cylinder. The heat from the exhaust vapor is used to preheat the water in these tubes before it enters the steam generator. The vapor then passes into the condenser.

=== Condenser ===
The condenser is a stack of interleaved circular plates, with an open core containing an impeller and a condensate sump underneath it. The exhaust vapor enters the top of the condenser from the piston block and is forced by the impeller onto the sides of the condenser and into the leaves of the circular plates. On the outside of the plates, a blower circulates air around the interleaved plates. This effectively condenses the exhaust vapor, which falls into the condensate sump at the bottom of the engine. A high pressure pump then pumps the condensate out of the sump, through the regenerative heating coils around the cylinder, and back into the steam generator.

== Schoell Cycle ==
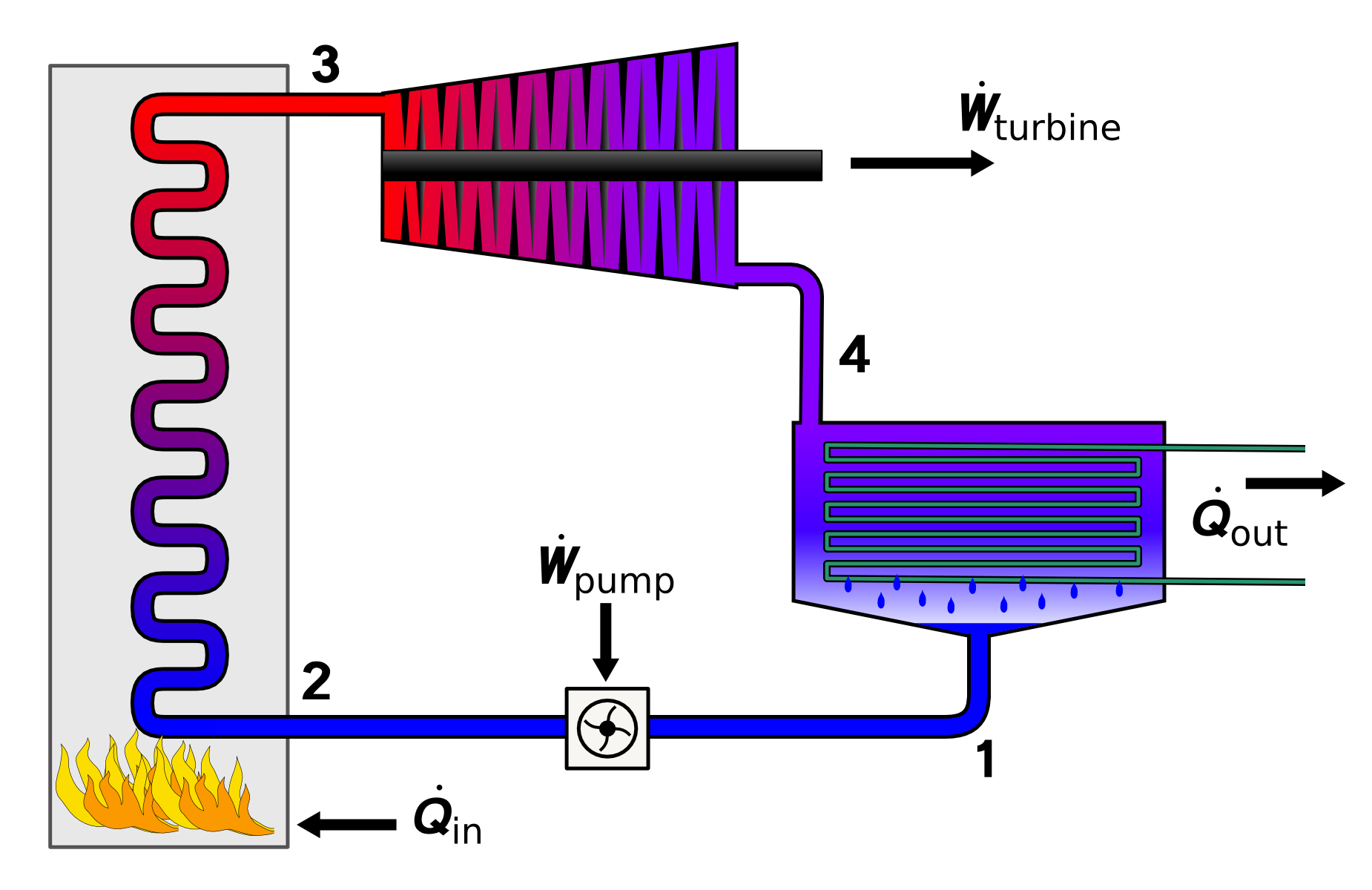
Physical layout of the four main devices used in the Rankine cycle

"Schoell Cycle" is the name given by inventor Harry Schoell to his implementation of the Rankine cycle. The primary patent for the engine calls it a "Heat regenerative engine"

In the Rankine cycle, water is pumped to high pressure, heated to produce steam, expanded in an engine producing mechanical work then heat is removed to condense the exhaust steam back into liquid water.

In the "Schoell Cycle", combustion air is first heated by passing it through the condenser, then heated further by passing it through a heat exchanger to absorb heat from the exhaust gasses. This improves engine efficiency as less fuel needs to be burned to heat the combustion gasses to a given temperature. This technology has been extensively used in industrial furnaces and powerplants where it is known as an air preheater or APH.

A feedwater heater is placed around each cylinder where the exhaust steam exits. This transfers some heat to the water before it enters the steam generator, further reducing the amount of fuel necessary.

Although the Schoell patent is titled "Heat regenerative engine", it does not use the regenerative Rankine cycle nor does it use a regenerative heat exchanger.

== Water lubrication ==
The Mark V engine's design requires the use of water to lubricate the moving parts for two reasons:

1. Exhaust steam goes into the engine crankcase. Any oil used to lubricate crankshaft and connecting rod bearings would soon form an emulsion of oil and water that would have very poor lubricating properties.
2. Because of the integrated form of the Mark V and its small water capacity, any oil that enters the water will not leave the water while the engine is running. This oil will then coat and foul the inner surfaces of the condenser and steam generator, greatly reducing their performance. A non-integrated steam power system might have, for instance, a large water tank that will give oil time to separate from the water, or dedicated devices to separate oil from water.

Journal bearings on the crankshaft and connecting rods and the pistons sliding in their cylinders operate in the hydrodynamic lubrication regime. The carrying capacity of a journal bearing is a direct function of the dynamic viscosity of the lubricating fluid. Water at 20 °C has a viscosity of 0.001002 Pa·s, while a typical motor oil could have a viscosity of about 0.250 Pa·s. Thus, water is about 250 times less effective a lubricant than oil.

Cyclone Power Technologies had contracted with the Ohio State University Center for Automotive Research (OSU-CAR) for engineering analysis. A March 8, 2014 presentation by OSU-CAR described the engine bearings as a "critical path issue" and stated:

- "Little or no data exists outside Cyclone’s own experience for the use of water lubrication for either ball bearings or roller bearings in our environment and under our loadings. Calculated life using just the bearing load and the scaling factors for the viscosity of the lubricant indicate that very high ratio of load capacity to applied load is required."
- "Minimal data exists for the use of water lubricated polymer journal bearings in our environment and under our loadings. Factors of a 4:1 increase in life have been shown with submerged operation, but little long term wear data is available with pressurized water lubrication."

The contract between Cyclone Power Technologies and Phoenix Power Group for the lower output WHE steam engine states that Phoenix Power Group will make a $150,000 progress payment "Upon the completion of 200 hours of durability testing of WHE version 5.0 as conducted and/or overseen by OSU. The durability testing shall consist of the WHE engine operating, without failure, and producing 10 hp to 20 hp". As of February 28, 2015 there has been no indication they have made a water lubricated engine pass this 200-hour endurance test.

== Measured Engine Performance ==
Very little information has been released by Cyclone Power Technologies on actual measured performance of the Mark V. The most detailed account comes from their Facebook page:

July 15, 2013 ·

GREAT NEWS for the Cyclone Mark V Engine

As of today! Dyno testing has recorded 100HP and 1000 ft-lb of torque.

No other information such as engine configuration, test conditions, measurements taken, or duration of test has been reported.

== Criticisms ==
Claims made for the Cyclone Mark V Engine include:

It's Clean: One promotional video claimed that exhaust leaving the engine would be cleaner than the air entering the engine: "The Cyclone will effectively act as an air scrubber that will help clean the air that we breath as it runs." However, in the 2013 Annual Report, they state: "We have not yet performed this testing on our engines to meet any existing emission standards of the EPA and CARB." No source has been provided to support their claim of low or no exhaust emissions.

It's Highly Efficient: Cyclone Power Technologies claims the Mark V engine has a thermal efficiency of 33% The source of this efficiency figure is a calculation based on a large number of assumed values. For instance, engine power output and fuel input values are both assumed. These give an estimated thermal efficiency of 23.2%. It is then assumed (without supporting calculations) that the heating of the combustion air improves overall engine efficiency by 4.05% and feedwater heating improves overall engine efficiency by a further 4.32%, bringing the total estimated engine thermal efficiency to 31.57%.

Portrayal of Mock-ups as Working Engines: A number of non-functional mock-ups of the Cyclone Mark V engine and larger and smaller variants have been built by Cyclone Power Technologies as promotional displays. The fact that they are not working engines, however, is often omitted. For instance, from various promotional videos:

- "The engine has its full torque at 1 rpm."; "It has an extremely clean exhaust because it burns fuel in a centrifuge."; "The exhaust temperature is much cooler than an internal combustion engine."; "You can put your hand on this engine when it's running."; "They're very, very smooth."; "We're getting an eight percent right on top of the thermal efficiency of the engine itself."; The efficiency is "In the 30% range, plus."; "As it sits for a while it builds up a little latent heat and you can get a real high burst of acceleration."; "In normal operation you have enough acceleration to pull a pretty good load without having to have a big transmission."; "Water explodes into steam and pushes the piston down."
- "There's a small engine over here that[sic] which is one of our waste heat engines that actually operates on waste heat from one of the larger Cyclones."; "This one will put out up to a maximum of 20 horsepower."; "Or an incinerated fuel, any trash, garbage or anything else can power this system here to generate your electricity from another source."; "As in these red, domed engines around here the fuel is burned in a centrifuge."; "The final exhaust temperature on these engines is only 350 degrees."; "This engine here can actually run off the last exhaust temperature of this engine here."; "You'll see a lawnmower on the market in about a year or 18 months."; On the efficiency: "This one is about half of those."; "These engines over here run in between the efficiency of gas and the low side of diesels."; "Efficiency is not a spike, it's nearly a straight line from the time it starts until the maximum RPM."; "Of course this one here is highly efficient because it runs on free fuel."; The lawnmower engine "is totally silent."
- "This is the 330 horsepower truck version and as you can see it has a waste heat recovery system. Of course, this engine only has a 350 degree exhaust signature."; "You don't have to run around in a toy car like these golf carts some of the automobile manufacturers are proposing. Now you can have something that will really drive a machine and have some horsepower and be even cleaner that what the electric vehicles will provide."; "As you notice it mounts into the chassis, it has no transmission because the torque level is so high."

In none of the videos does Harry Schoell state that the engines he points to are non-functional mock-ups, nor does he say any claims of performance are predictions and are not based on any actual measurements.

== Applications ==
As of February 13, 2016 no Mark V engines had been delivered to any customers or publicly demonstrated running. Proposed applications included:

- A 60 kW generator set fueled by waste motor oil
- Chuk Williams' steam-powered land speed record car, followed by a land speed record car built by Cyclone Power Technologies
- A speed boat designed to break the steam-powered water speed record.
- A multi-fuel engine to provide hydraulic power to forklift trucks

However, none of these proposals have been known to be implemented.

== Variants ==
While the Mark V engine is the basic engine described in Cyclone Power Technologies' patents, a number of smaller and larger variants have been announced at different times.

Model	Size	Announced	Details
Mark IV	~4 hp	July 10, 2004	Possibly the first test engine.; None known to have been sold, or demonstrated publicly.
Mark II	18 hp	October 12, 2004	Applications described as "Portable & aux.power, light equipment"; Witnessed running March 4, 2005 and a 15 second video was made.; None known to have been sold.
Mark VI	330 hp	Aug. 22, 2007	Applications described as "Heavy transport, powerplant, heavy equipment"; Displayed at the 2007 SAE Commercial Vehicle Convention "Cyclone will display at this premier industry event its 100 HP Automotive Engine and its 330 HP Truck Engine, which will be installed in a full truck chassis for the first time." However, both engines were non-functional display mockups.; No working version of the Mark VI has been known to have been built.
Lawn Mower	5 hp	November 26, 2007	Engine technology licensed to Revgine Inc. of Rochester, New York.; "Revgine has been granted the right to develop, manufacture and sell engines utilizing Cyclone's patented technology for use in lawn and garden equipment, such as lawn mowers, weed eaters, leaf blowers, snow blowers and chain saws."; By April 2010, Cyclone Power Technologies announced "We have temporarily put on-hold the lawn mower project under our license with Revgine Inc."; Although a non-functional display mockup was produced, no working engine is known to have been built.
Genie	80 W	September 3, 2008	Applications described as "Portable power, battery charge-military"; Design was "originally commissioned in May 2008 by APS (Advent Power Systems Inc.) and its client, MEO Products Ltd, a defense industry supplier based in the UK."; "The company expects to deliver these beta prototype engines by the middle of 2009". Four engines were ordered.; In May 2013, Cyclone Power Technologies reported "Cyclone's interest in micro-sized power units began several years ago with its 100W "Genie" concept, which was put on-hold pending additional funding and strategic partners."; Although a non-functional display mockup was produced, no working engine is known to have been built.
WHE (Waste Heat Engine)	16-100 hp	Mar 31, 2008	Applications described as "Waste heat recovery, Biomass-to-power"; Described as "a lower-pressure, lower-temperature offshoot of the Cyclone Engine"; See main article Cyclone Waste Heat Engine
Solar I	5–15 hp	May 5, 2009	Engine technology licensed to Renovalia Energy, S.A., based in Madrid, Spain for use in concentrating solar collectors.; The May 2009 announcement stated "the engine, called Cyclone Solar I, which could be deployed worldwide with their solar stations within a year."; On November 8, 2011 Cyclone Power Technologies delivered "prototype design plans" which satisfied the terms of the license.; It is not clear if this engine design has been built.
S-2	10 kW	August 2011	Cyclone Power Technologies and their licensee Advent Power Systems won a $1.4 million contract from U.S. Army / TACOM (Tank Automotive Command) to develop a compact 10 kW generator set: "The first prototype engine systems are scheduled to be developed, tested and delivered within 12 months."; Cyclone Power Technologies announced delivery of one engine in May 2014.; No details of acceptance criteria or engine performance have been given.
Mark III	? hp	November 3, 2014	Frankie Fruge, President of Cyclone announced "This is just the first part of a working relationship with Republic Energy with plans of integrating our Mark 3 engines into the system." No details of the engine have been given.; February 14, 2016: One engine given to company 3R of Denmark, no statement made about engine operation.
Mark I	5 hp	November 7, 2014	Small, general purpose engine, configuration and details unknown.; Cyclone Power Technologies announced "that HyPex Inc. is manufacturing a pre-production of 10 Mark I engines to test performance and quality control before going into engine production on a larger scale."; On February 24, 2015, "Cyclone has just received the pre-production parts for 10 Mark 1 Engines and they are in the process of being assembled."
Mark 7	? hp	February 18, 2016	Announcement of agreement with 3R of Denmark to develop this engine.; Configuration and details unknown, possibly a derivative of the Mark III.
