= Rockbreaker =

Piece of industrial machinery

A rockbreaker is a machine designed to manipulate large rocks, including reducing large rocks into smaller rocks. They are typically used in the mining industry to remove oversize rocks that are too large or too hard to be reduced in size by a crusher. Rockbreakers consist of two major components, a hydraulic hammer (used to break rocks) and a boom (the arm). There are two major types of rock breakers, mobile and stationary - typically placed on a pedestal or slew frame.

== Automation ==
In 2008, researchers from the CSIRO implemented remote-operation functionality for a Transmin rockbreaker located at Rio Tinto's West Angelas mine from Perth, over 1,000 km away.

In 2011, Transmin developed the first commercially available automation system for pedestal rockbreakers. The system was first installed at Newcrest's Ridgeway Deeps gold mine providing collision avoidance and remote operation functionality.

== See also ==
- Breaker (hydraulic)
- Jackhammer
- Excavator
