= LS3 =

LS3 may refer to:

- GM LS engine
- Legged Squad Support System, a military robot.
- The postcode area for the north-western part of Central Leeds
- Rolladen-Schneider LS3, a sailplane
- LS3/5A loudspeaker designed by the BBC
