= Martin Buehler =

American electrical engineer

Martin Buehler is an electrical engineer working at Johnson and Johnson. He was named a Fellow of the Institute of Electrical and Electronics Engineers (IEEE) in 2015 for his contributions to metrology through development of semiconductor process control test structures, gas sensors, and radiation detectors.

Buehler is also known for the co-development of Roomba and was a lead developer of BigDog at Boston Dynamics. In 2018, he joined Alex Vardakostas to develop a robot named "Creator" whose function would be to flip burgers at various fast food restaurants such as Chick-fil-A.
