= Marc Raibert =

Chairman of Boston Dynamics

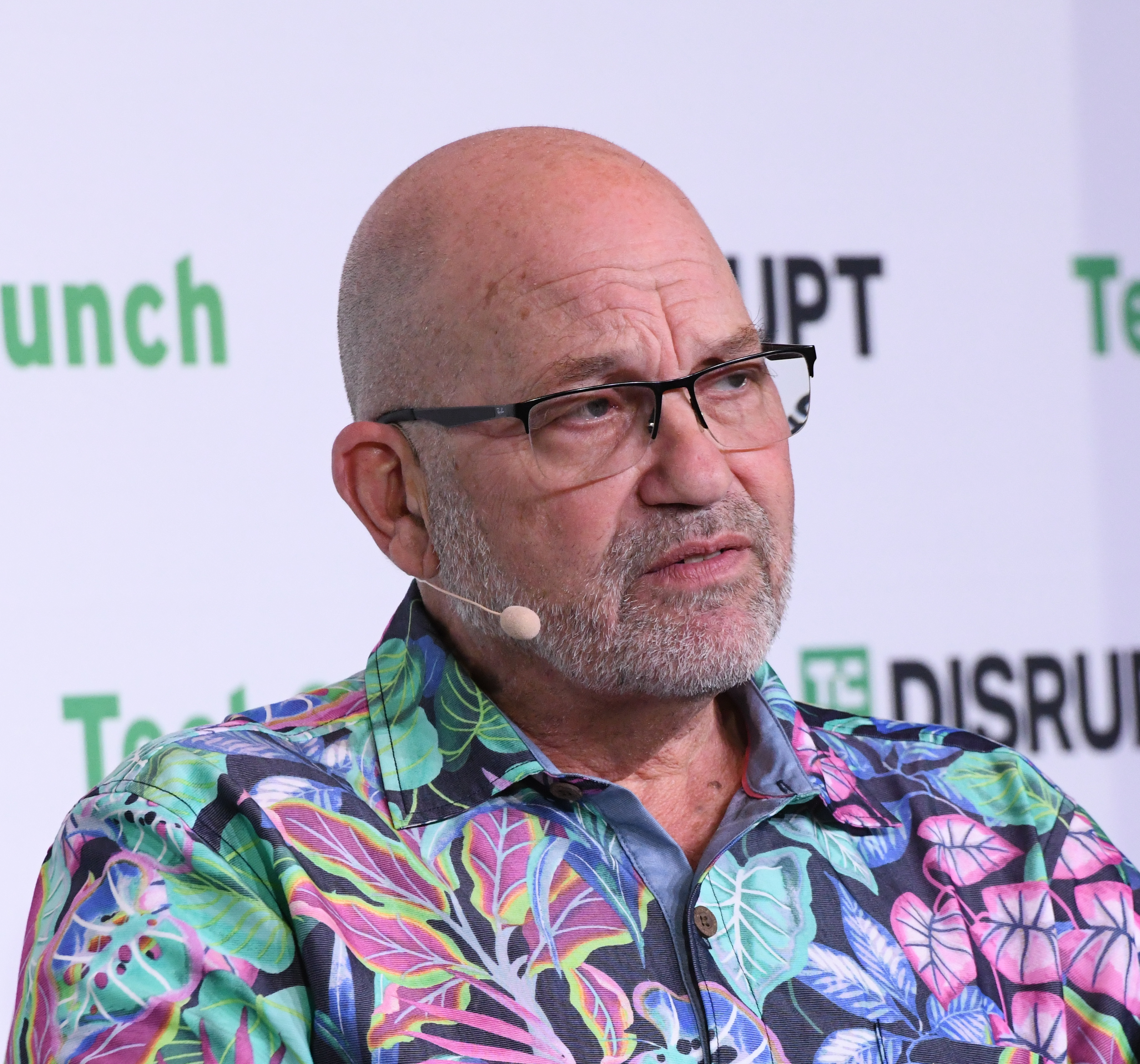
- Raibert in 2023
- Born: December 22, 1949 (age 76)
- Education: Massachusetts Institute of Technology; Northeastern University
- Known for: Founder and Chairman of robot maker Boston Dynamics
- Scientific career
- Fields: Robotics
- Thesis: Motor Control and Learning by the State Space Model
- Doctoral advisor: Berthold K.P. Horn and Whitman Richards

Marc Raibert (born December 22, 1949) is the Executive Director of the Boston Dynamics AI Institute, a Hyundai Motor Group organization. Raibert was the founder, former CEO, and now Chairman of Boston Dynamics, a robotics company known for creating BigDog, Atlas, Spot, and Handle.

Before starting Boston Dynamics, Raibert was professor of Electrical Engineering and Computer Science at MIT and an associate professor of Computer Science and Robotics at Carnegie Mellon University. At CMU he founded the Leg Laboratory (1980), a lab that helped establish the scientific basis for highly dynamic robots. Raibert developed the first self-balancing hopping robots, a significant step forward in robotics. Raibert earned an Electrical Engineering, BSEE from Northeastern University in 1973 and a PhD from MIT in 1977. His dissertation was titled "Motor control and learning by the state space model" and was advised by Berthold Horn and Whitman Richards. Raibert is a Founding Fellow of the Association for the Advancement of Artificial Intelligence. He was elected a member of the National Academy of Engineering in 2008 for biomechanically motivated analysis, synthesis, control, and application of multi-legged robots.

Raibert's dream is to advance bipedal and quadrupedal robotics to a supernatural state. Boston Dynamics was acquired by Google in December 2013. On the acquisition, Raibert commented that he was "excited by Andy Rubin and Google’s ability to think very, very big... with the resources to make it happen." In March 2016, Google began offering Boston Dynamics for sale. The company was acquired by SoftBank in June 2017. In 2020, Boston Dynamics was acquired by Hyundai Motor Group.

== Patents granted to Marc Raibert ==
=== Actuator system ===
- U.S. patent 8,126,592 Actuator system, Issued: February 28, 2012

An actuator subsystem preferably for a robot or bionic linkage. A joint between two robotic or bionic members includes at least first and second actuators such as piston-cylinder assemblies connected between the members. A hydraulic circuit includes a sensor subsystem for sensing the magnitude of the load on the piston-cylinder assemblies and/or members. A fluid supply system includes an actuatable control valve operable to supply fluid to one or both piston-cylinder assemblies. A control circuit is responsive to the sensor and is configured to electronically control the fluid subsystem to supply fluid to the first piston-cylinder assembly when the sensor subsystem senses a load below a predetermined magnitude and to supply fluid to both piston-cylinder assemblies when the sensor subsystem senses a load above the predetermined magnitude. Co-inventor: Aaron Saunders

=== Robot apparatus and method for controlling jumping of robot device ===
- U.S. patent 6,484,068 Robot apparatus and method for controlling jumping of robot device, Issued: November 19, 2002

A robot apparatus that is able to perform jumping. In a leg structure 110 of the robot apparatus, connecting bars 113, 114 and pivots 112a to 112d constitute a four-point link mechanism. A rod 117 is inserted into an opening formed in the distal end of a leg part 116. A coil spring 118 as an elastic member is provided between one end of the rod 117 and the distal end of the leg part 116. A bar member 120 is connected and secured to a preset point of a connecting member 115 as a knee joint. The coil spring 118 is extended/contracted by the stretching/contraction of the connecting member 115. By the operation of the four-point link mechanism, the trajectory of the distal end of the leg part is linear. The coil spring 118 is mounted at a position such that the distance between a driving shaft 101 and the distal end of the bar member 120 has a substantially linear relationship with respect to the force virtually operating between a driving shaft 101 and the distal end of the bar member 120. Co-inventors: Takashi Yamamoto, Martin de Lasa, Shervin Talebinejad, Darrin Jewell, Robert Playter

== In fiction ==
Several of the MIT Leg Lab robots appear in the movie Rising Sun.

== Appearances ==
Raibert was a keynote speaker at the 2016 Congress of Future Science and Technology Leaders.

On May 11, 2018 Marc Raibert took part in TechCrunch Sessions: Robotics 2018 where he spoke about the SpotMini robot that Boston Dynamics will begin to sell in 2019.

In April 2019, Raibert spoke at the TechCrunch Sessions: Robotics 2019, where he presented the newest uses for the SpotMini robot.

In October 2022, Marc Raibert presented at the IEEE/RSJ International Conference on Intelligent Robots and Systems in Kyoto on “A Culture of Robotics Research.”

On November 16, 2022, Marc Raibert presented at Bloomberg’s New Economy Forum in Singapore about the future of robotics and the mission of The AI Institute.

== See also ==
- BigDog, a self-balancing four-legged pony-sized robot from Boston Dynamics.
- Raibert's biography page at MIT
