= Asencio =

American painter

Henry Asencio
- Born: 1978 (age 47–48); Los Angeles, California, U.S.
- Known for: Female figure painting
- Style: Abstract expressionism; Abstract realism/naturalism
- Website: www.asenciostudio.com

Henry Asencio (born 1978) is an American painter who works largely in the medium of oil on canvas in the abstract expressionism style. He is known for his paintings of the female form on abstract backgrounds.

== Early life ==
Henry Asencio was born in 1978 in Los Angeles and raised in Santa Maria, California. He painted as a self-taught artist up until his mid-twenties. Asencio experimented with elements of realism, specifically photorealism. After years of experimentation with various global influences, Asencio developed a unique artistic style of his own.

== Career ==
In 1996, the art supply company, Thayer and Chandler, sponsored Asencio's work, including Asencio in touring exhibitions throughout countries in Europe, including Germany and France. In 1998, Asencio's work was recognized in an art competition in Amsterdam, winning gold and silver medals, for self-portraiture in oils and work in acrylic medium, respectively. He studied and trained in the area of fine art, graduating with honors from the San Francisco Academy of Art University in 1999. He was a chosen finalist for his portraiture in the 1999 Artist's Magazine competition.

Asencio began his professional painting career in 2000 with limited edition mixed media prints. These prints use techniques that combine lithography and serigraphy. Once printed, the paintings are then each hand embellished. Prints are produced in limited editions of 195, 25 Artist's proofs. Asencio lives in San Jose, California, home to his personal studio.

== Style ==
Asencio's painting style is loosely defined in a contemporary format, combining elements of expressionism and realism with abstract painting techniques. Asencio's art has been described as "abstract expressionism" and "abstract realism". He says of his own style:

My strongest influences as far as technique are the Abstract Expressionists. I like very much that they had their own philosophy. I use what I am more empathetic with and that blends somewhat with my own personality. There are giants in the art world who really move me: de Kooning (he makes every stroke of the brush different), Lucien Freud (his work of the flesh is unsurpassed), Picasso (unbelievable vision, work ethic and unrelenting passion) and Klimt (making decorative painting with honesty). If I can bring as much integrity or do as much as they can as far as choosing my own path and following it, I'll be happy. The recognition I don't need as much.

== Exhibitions, collections, and selected works ==
- September 2013: Artist appearance, "Festival of Fashion" at The Forum Shops at Caesars, Las Vegas, NV
- August 2013: Exhibition, "The Goddess" at Exclusive Collections Seaport Village Gallery, San Diego, CA
- August 2012: Exhibition, "Visions in Crimson" at Exclusive Collections Seaport Village Gallery, San Diego, CA
- May 2012: Exhibition, "Grand Opening" at Exclusive Collections Forum Shops Gallery, Las Vegas, NV
- April 2012: Exhibition, "Best of the Best" Gala at The Marine Room, La Jolla, CA
- October 2011: Exhibition, Galeria del Mar, St. Augustine, FL
- August 2011: Exhibition, "The Painted Word" at Exclusive Collections Fashion Valley Gallery, San Diego, CA
- March 2011: Exhibition, "Reflection" at Clarendon Fine Art, Mayfair, United Kingdom
- October 2010: Exhibition, Galeria del Mar, St. Augustine, FL
- August 2010: Exhibition, "Allegro" at Exclusive Collections Fashion Valley Gallery, San Diego, CA
- 2009: Museum of Latin American Art, Long Beach, CA
- 2009: Exhibition, Galeria del Mar, St. Augustine, FL
- August 2009: Exhibition, "Crescendo" at Exclusive Collections Fashion Valley Gallery, San Diego, CA
- 2002–2009: New York Art Expo, NY
- 2008: Tour, United Kingdom
- 2008: Exhibition, Galeria del Mar, St. Augustine, FL
- August 2008: Exhibition, Exclusive Collections Fashion Valley Gallery, San Diego, CA
- 2007: Exhibition, Galeria del Mar, St. Augustine, FL
- 1996: Thayer and Chandler Sponsorship Tour

== Awards and honors ==
- Gold and Silver Medal Amsterdam Art Competition
- 2007, 2008, 2009, 2010: "Today's Top Artist", Art Business News
