= Arquay Harris =

American software developer

- Education: James Madison University, Academy of Art University
- Occupation: Software developer
- Awards: Forbes' America's Top 50 Women in Tech 2018

Arquay Harris is an American software developer and former senior director of engineering at Slack. Since April 2021, she has been vice president of engineering at Webflow.

In 2018, Harris was named one of "America's Top 50 Women in Tech" by Forbes.

== Early life and education ==
Harris graduated from James Madison University with a Bachelor of Arts and Science degree. She went on to study at the Academy of Art University, continuing her technical education as well as practicing fine art painting in 3D, graduating with a degree in Fine Arts.

== Professional career ==
Harris started her career in technical production at CNET before moving into a software development role at CBS. She moved from the media industry to the technology industry when she joined Google, where she ultimately worked as a web development manager, leading a team of information architects, software developers and designers. In June 2016, she joined Slack, where she ultimately held the position of senior director of engineering, expansion. In her first week at Slack, she started a project to redesign Slack's user interface using principles of responsive design.

In April 2021, she joined Webflow, where she holds the position of vice president of engineering, growth.

== Awards and recognition ==
- Forbes magazine's "America's Top 50 Women in Tech 2018"
