= Academy of Art University =

For-profit art school in San Francisco, USA

Coordinates: 37.78785°N 122.40065°W

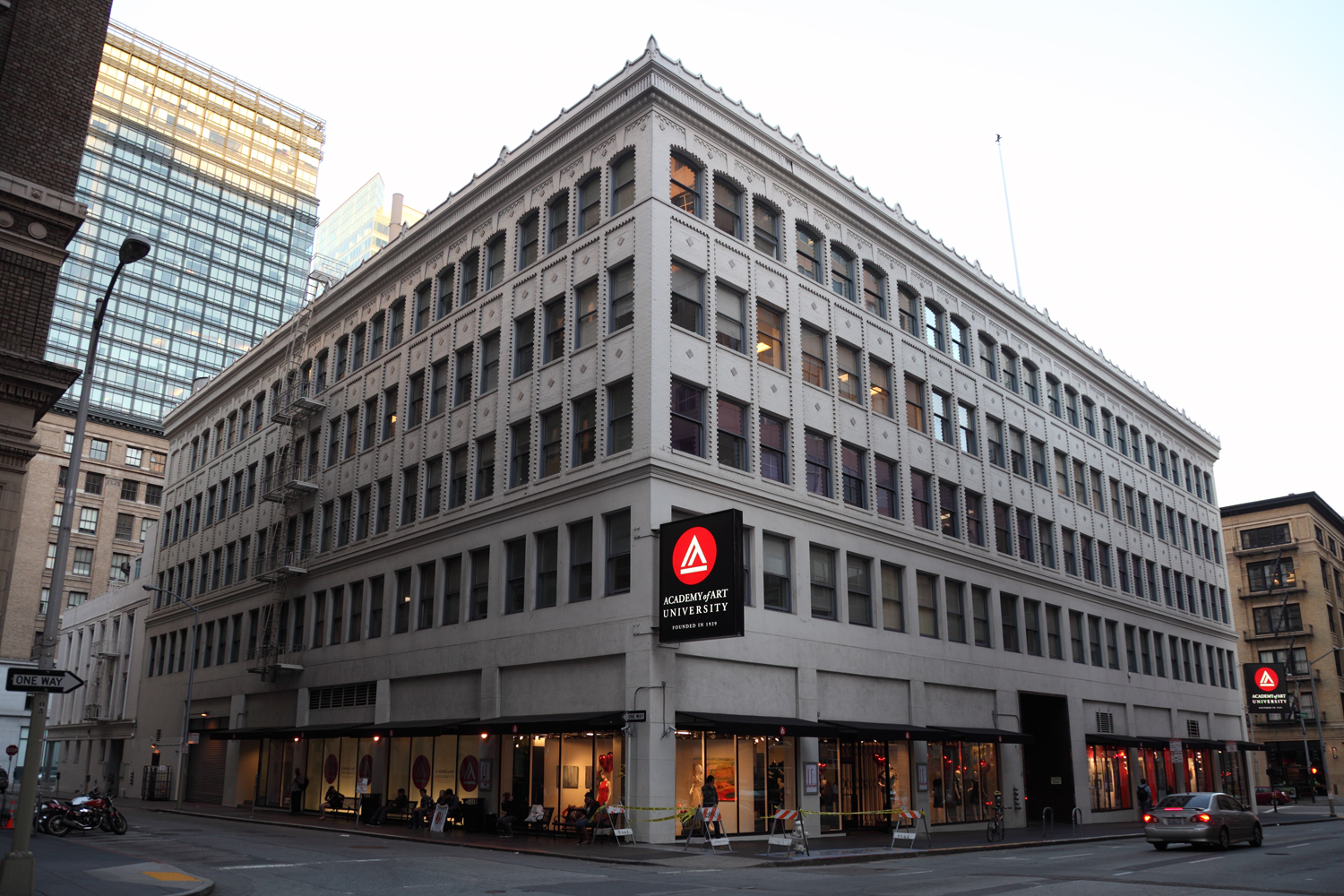
- Former names: Académie of Advertising Art, Academy of Advertising Art, Richard Stephens Academy of Art, Academy of Art College
- Motto: Built by artists for artists
- Type: Private for-profit art school
- Established: 1929
- President: Chris Visslailli
- Faculty: 94 full-time, 508 part-time (fall 2024)
- Students: 5,498 (fall 2024)
- Undergraduates: 3,644 (fall 2024)
- Postgraduates: 1,854 (fall 2024)
- Location: San Francisco, California, United States
- Campus: Urban and online
- Colors: Black and Red
- Sporting affiliations: None
- Website: academyart.edu
- Chief executive officer: Elisa Stephens

The Academy of Art University, formerly Academy of Art College and Richard Stephens Academy of Art, is a private for-profit art school in San Francisco, California. It was founded as the Academy of Advertising Art by Richard S. Stephens in 1929. The school is one of the largest property owners in San Francisco, with the main campus located on New Montgomery Street in the South of Market district.

In fall 2024, it had 95 full-time teachers, 508 part-time teaching staff, and 5,498 students; it claims to be the largest privately owned art and design school in the United States.

== History ==
It was founded in 1929 as Académie of Advertising Art, a school for advertising art, at 215 Kearny Street. The founder, Richard S. Stephens, a painter and editor for Sunset Magazine, led it until 1951 when his son Richard A. Stephens took over. In 1992, Stephens was replaced by his daughter, Elisa Stephens.

The university owns and operates the Academy of Art University Automobile Museum, which has a collection of 200 vintage, muscle, and rare contemporary cars going back to the 1990s.

The school has been participating in the New York Fashion Week event bi-annually since 2005. Every year, the university hosts a spring show titled "Us Now" that highlights B.F.A. and M.F.A. student design work from the school's 75 disciplines.

In 2006, AAU acquired the Commodore Hotel for approximately $15.7 million; the building was then converted into co-ed student housing, called "Commodore Hall."

In 2009, four former admission officers alleged that the school had compensated them based on how many students they could enroll, which was an incentive-based recruitment technique. The former employees sued the school in U.S. District Court in Oakland in 2009.

In May 2016, the city of San Francisco brought a lawsuit against Academy of Art University after possible violations of city land-use laws, including the unauthorized conversion of rent-controlled housing to academic use. In December 2016, the school was ordered pay the city $20 million in fees and $40 million in housing concessions, such as providing low-income housing for seniors. In January 2020, the agreement was amended, requiring the Academy of Art University to pay $37.6 million to build affordable housing.

In 2023, ten architecture and landscape projects by AAU students were featured in Dezeen magazine.

In 2024, AAU sold the Da Vinci Villa, a 153-unit student housing complex in Russian Hill, for $16.5 million. It was also announced that AAU planned to sell the 114-unit Commodore student dorm building and restore its former use as a hotel. The university currently lists student housing options at 560 Powell St.; 620 Sutter St.; 680 Sutter St.; 1080 Bush St.; and 655 Sutter St. In 2026, Academy of Art University began leasing three properties (1916 Octavia Street, 2209 Van Ness Avenue and 1153 Bush Street) to The Residency, a startup founder hostel and research lab.

== Academics ==
The university offers associate, bachelor's and master's degrees along with BFA, MFA, B.Arch and M.Arch degrees, in over forty-two art and design subjects across its twenty-two schools. These courses are also offered online, featuring an “Synchronous Online Class” selection of classes in which remote students can virtually attend classes in real time alongside on-campus counterparts.

Academy of Art University received regional accreditation from the Western Association of Schools and Colleges (WASC) in 2007. In interior architecture and design, the Bachelor of Fine Arts degree (taught or online) and Master of Fine Arts degree are accredited by the Council for Interior Design Accreditation. The Master of Architecture degree has, since January 1, 2006, been accredited by the National Architectural Accrediting Board while the Bachelor of Architecture program was granted as of January 1, 2015.

According to the National Center for Education Statistics, 45% of students who began their studies in fall 2013 completed a four-year degree within 150% of that time (the "6-year graduation rate"). For online-only students, the 6-year graduation rate was 6% and 3% for part-time students in mid-2015. Approximately 35% of all students were online-only in 2015. In 2016, roughly 7% of students completed a four-year degree within the allotted time.

According to data from the National Center for Education Statistics in 2019, the school's graduation rate for "full-time, first-time" students was 45%. The school has open admissions and an admission acceptance rate of 100%. In 2016, its accreditor expressed concern over low graduation rates; 37% of students who enrolled in 2010 graduated by 2017.

== Athletics ==
The school sports teams, the Urban Knights, competed as members of the Pacific West Conference in 14 sports in NCAA Division II.

In the 2014–2015 season, the men's cross country team had a second-place finish and the women's team had a record fourth-place finish, earned at the Pacific West Conference Championships. Valentin Pepiot, their third NCAA Nationals individual qualifier, was one of the top finishers from the PacWest in the postseason finale. Academy of Art earned a record 10 PacWest postseason honors. For the 2015 indoor and outdoor track and field seasons, they had seven All-American honors and one NCAA individual champion in Jordan Edwards.

In May 2023, the San Francisco Shock announced a partnership with Academy of Art University for its 2023 OWL season. The university's campus will be the official home of the Shock, allowing access to its facilities and housing.

On April 4, 2025, university officials announced that they were eliminating the athletic department following the 2024–2025 season.

== Notable alumni ==
- Mobolade Ajomale, Canadian Olympic sprinter
- Henry Asencio, figurative painter
- Rick Baker, winner of an Academy Award for Best Makeup and Hairstyling and special effects for An American Werewolf in London
- Deanne Fitzmaurice, photographer and photojournalist, winner of a 2005 Pulitzer Prize
- Vicky Jenson, film director
- Kara Laricks, fashion designer
- Bilal Lashari, Pakistani film director and cinematographer
- Cheol-ha Lee, film director
- Chris Milk, music video director and photographer
- Rodrigo Prieto, cinematographer
- Jolene Marie Cholock-Rotinsulu, Indonesian actress, TV commercial model, singer, Puteri Indonesia 2019 and Miss International Indonesia 2019
- Rudianto Soedjarwo, Indonesian film director, film and television movie producer, cinematographer, graphic designer and film maker
- Raven-Symoné, actress and singer
- Agnieszka Pilat, artist
- Arquay Harris, software developer

== Notable faculty ==
Past and present faculty of the school include:

- Diane Baker, actress
- Tom Bertino, animator
- James Claussen, lithographer and abstract painter
- Richard Hart, journalist
- Kamshad Kooshan, movie writer & director
- Tim McGovern, Academy Award-winning visual effects director
- Jana Sue Memel, film producer, director, & writer
- Jack Perez, director and writer
- Adam Savage, creator of MythBusters
- Peter Schifrin (born 1958), Olympic fencer and sculptor
- Doug Siebum, sound designer
- Art Spiegelman, cartoonist
- Terryl Whitlatch, illustrator
- Lindsey Yamasaki, basketball player

== See also ==
- American Conservatory Theater
- The Art Institute of California – San Francisco
- California College of the Arts
- San Francisco Art Institute
- List of colleges and universities in California
