= Legged Squad Support System =

DARPA project for a legged robot

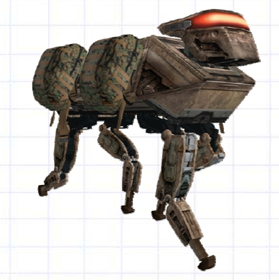
Legged Squad Support System, conceptual design

The Legged Squad Support System (LS3) was a DARPA project for a legged robot which could function autonomously as a packhorse for a squad of soldiers or marines. Like BigDog, its quadruped predecessor, the LS3 was ruggedized for military use, with the ability to operate in hot, cold, wet, and dirty environments. The LS3 was put into storage in late 2015.

== Specifications ==
The Legged Squad Support System was to "Go where dismounts go, do what dismounts do, work among dismounts," carry 400 pounds (180 kg) of squad equipment, sense and negotiate terrain, maneuver nimbly, and operate quietly when required.

The LS3 was approximately the shape and size of a horse. A stereo vision system, consisting of a pair of stereo cameras mounted into the 'head' of the robot, was integrated alongside a light detecting and ranging (LIDAR) component in order to enable it to follow a human lead and record intelligence gathered through its camera.

The LS3's military variant dimensions were 2.5 feet in width (76 centimeters), 7.5 feet in length (2.30 meters), 5 feet in height (1.52 meters) and 800 pounds (362 kilograms) of weight. LS3 was over two times bigger than BigDog, and 3 times heavier.

== History ==
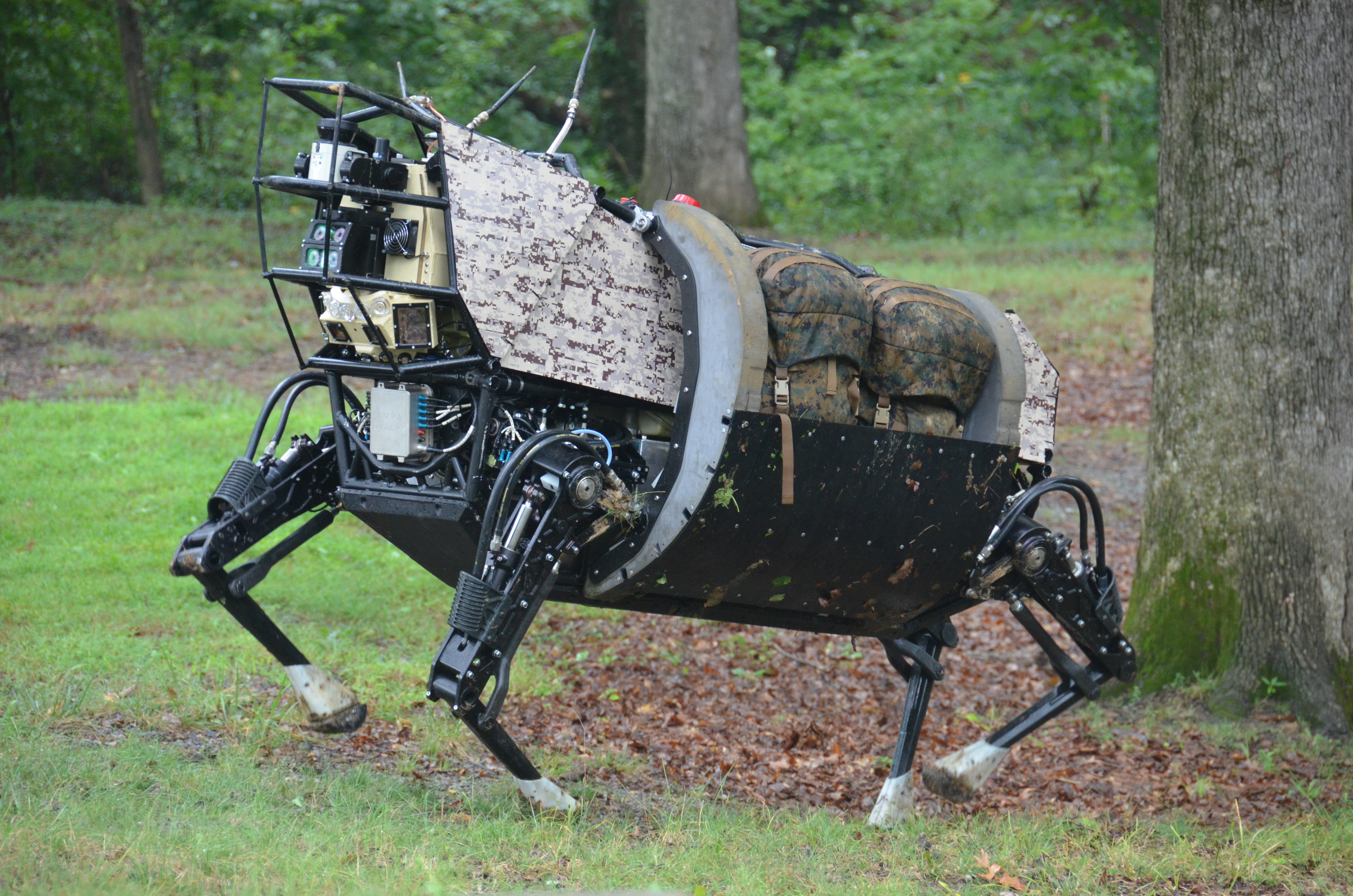
Complete version of LS3 in 2012

The initial contract for the Legged Squad Support System was awarded to Boston Dynamics on December 3, 2009. The constant evolution of the BigDog led to the development of the LS3, also known as AlphaDog. The contract schedule called for an operational demonstration of two units with troops in 2012. DARPA continued to support the program and carried out the first outdoor exercise on the latest variation of the LS3 in February 2012, with it successfully demonstrating its full capabilities during a planned hike encompassing tough terrain. Following its initial success, an 18-month plan was unveiled, which saw DARPA complete the overall development of the system and refine its key capabilities, due to start in summer 2012.

On September 9, 2012, two LS3 prototypes were demonstrated in an outdoor test. One of them had done so earlier in the year. The LS3 prototypes completed trotting and jogging mobility runs, perception visualization demonstrations, and a soldier-bounded autonomy demonstrations. They were roughly 10 times quieter than the original platform, as they used exhaust silencer. Other improvements included a 1 to 3 mph walk and trot over rough, rocky terrain, an easy transition to a 5 mph jog, and a 7 mph run over flat surfaces.

In early December 2012, the LS3 performed walks through woods in Fort Pickett, Virginia. These tests were with a human controller giving voice commands to the robot to give it orders. Giving voice commands was seen as a more efficient way of controlling the LS3, because a soldier would be too occupied with a joystick and computer screens to focus on a mission. There were ten commands that the system could understand; saying "engine on" activated it, "follow tight" made it walk on the same path as the controller, and "follow corridor" made it generate the path most efficient for itself to follow the human operator. Others included basic orders like "stop" and "engine off." Continued work was done to make the LS3 more mobile, like traversing a deep snow-covered hill, or avoiding gunfire and bombs on the battlefield. DARPA intended to supply a Marine company with an LS3 by 2014. From 7-10 October 2013, the LS3 took part in testing, along with other systems, at Fort Benning, Georgia as part of the U.S. Army's Squad Multipurpose Equipment Transport (S-MET) program, an effort to find an unmanned robotic platform to transport soldier equipment and charge batteries for their electronic gear.

The LS3 was used by Marines in July 2014 during Exercise RIMPAC 2014. After five years of development, the system had reached a level of maturity for it to operate with Marines from the 3rd Battalion, 3rd Marine Regiment in a realistic combat exercise. One company nicknamed the machine "Cujo" and used it to resupply various platoons in places difficult to reach by all-terrain vehicles. Operators were surprised at the level of stability and reliability it had walking; although it was able to traverse 70-80 percent of terrain, it did have problems negotiating obliques and contours of hills. When it did fall over, the system was able to right itself most of the time, and even when it needed assistance it only required one person because it is designed to be easily rolled upright. Controls, like joysticks, were similar to those for video games, making them simple to learn. Due to loud noise during movement and difficulty traversing certain terrains, the LS3 was used as a logistical tool rather than a tactical one. Further development continued on creating more space for equipment, including heavy weapons.

By late 2015, the Marines had put the LS3 into storage because of limitations with the robot including loud noise, challenges in repairing it if it breaks, and how to integrate it into a traditional Marine patrol. Since 2010, development had cost $42 million total. No future experiments or upgrades are planned, and it would take a new contract and interest from Marine Corps top brass to resurrect the program. Although creation of the LS3 did not result in accepting it into service, it did provide important insights about autonomous technology.
