= Academy of Art University Automobile Museum =

Museum in San Francisco, California

- Location: 1849 Washington Street; San Francisco, California
- Coordinates: 37.793020°N 122.423430°W
- Type: Automobile museum
- Website: www.academyautomuseum.org

The Academy of Art University Automobile Museum is a non-profit museum located in San Francisco, California. The museum serves both as a conservator of automotive history and as a tool for students in the industrial design department at the Academy of Art University, particularly those in the Automotive Restoration program.

In 2015, Forbes estimated the value of the museum's collection to be $70 million. With over 42 exhibits on display, the museum is accessible for both AAU students as well as the general public.

== History ==
A former President of the Academy of Art University, Richard A. Stephens, started the museum and is the proprietor of over half of the cars. The Stephens family—including Richard's daughter and current University President Elisa Stephens—began to seriously collect antique cars in the 1990s. The first car purchased for the collection was a 1929 Packard, which was built the same year that the university was founded.

In 1999, AAU purchased its main showroom at 1849 Washington Street.

In 2009, the museum exhibited 30 cars from the 1930s at the 52nd Annual International Auto Show.

In 2013, 34 vehicles were featured at the International Auto Show, presented by Autotrader.com. The vehicles were chosen by AAU's Industrial Design Department Director Tom Matano. Kevin Diamond, director of the show said: "We are proud to be able to exhibit vehicles from the museum that represent the elegance, style, craftsmanship, technology and innovative spirit of automotive designers past and present."

In 2016, over 30 cars from the museum's collection were displayed at the 59th annual International Auto Show at San Francisco's Moscone Center. Hemmings Motor News’ Dan Stoner described the museum as having "one of the largest collections of antique cars on the West Coast."

In 2018, Academy of Art University auctioned off 50 cars at Mecum Las Vegas for $3.7 million. Early in 2018, Robert Fisher was announced as the new CEO of the Academy of Art University Automobile Museum.

In May 2019, four cars were sold for $467,500; and 15 more cars were sold in August 2019 for $1.69 million.

== Collection ==
The Automobile Museum features 170 vintage vehicles. Notable classic cars include: Duesenberg Model J (1930), Cord L29 Convertible Coupe (1931), Alfa-Romeo 6C 2500 SS Berlinetta Aerodinamica (1939), Tucker 48 (1948), Chrysler Town & Country Convertible Coupe (1948), and Mercedes-Benz 300SL "Gullwing" Coupe (1955).

The museum's Tucker 48 is production car #1003. The car was purchased at auction for $2,035,000 from the previous owner, George Lucas. The car has also been exhibited at the San Francisco International Auto Show, among other car shows.

The Mercedes-Benz 300SL was previously owned by Jenny Craig, and has both fitted luggage and strawberry metallic paint. Only 10 Rolls-Royce Phantom 1 Rivieras (1929) were ever made, the museum's car being one of them.

The museum also exhibits the 1933 Pierce-Arrow Silver Arrow, which can reach a speed of 115 mph and was previously owned and restored by William F. Harrah. Only five of these cars were built in total, with and only two others remaining today.

A 1996 Mazda Miata M-Edition and a 1995 Mazda RX-7 are present at the museum. They were formerly owned by former executive director of Industrial Design, Tom Matano, until his death in September 2025. Matano was the designer of both the first-generation Miata and third-generation RX-7.

== Automotive Restoration Program ==
Students in AAU's industrial design program can get an associate degree in auto restoration. Through a partnership with Stellantis, students can participate in a course where the goal is to design, brand, and build vehicle components that reflect Stellantis. Previous course sponsors have included: Alfa Romeo, Maserati, Jeep, Subaru, Audi, Volkswagen Group, and General Motors.

== Charities ==
Proceeds from the museum go to both the Rotary Club and the Boys and Girls Club. Every $10 admission fee received during the hours it is open to the public each week is donated to these charities.
