= Agnieszka Pilat =

Polish-American artist and painter

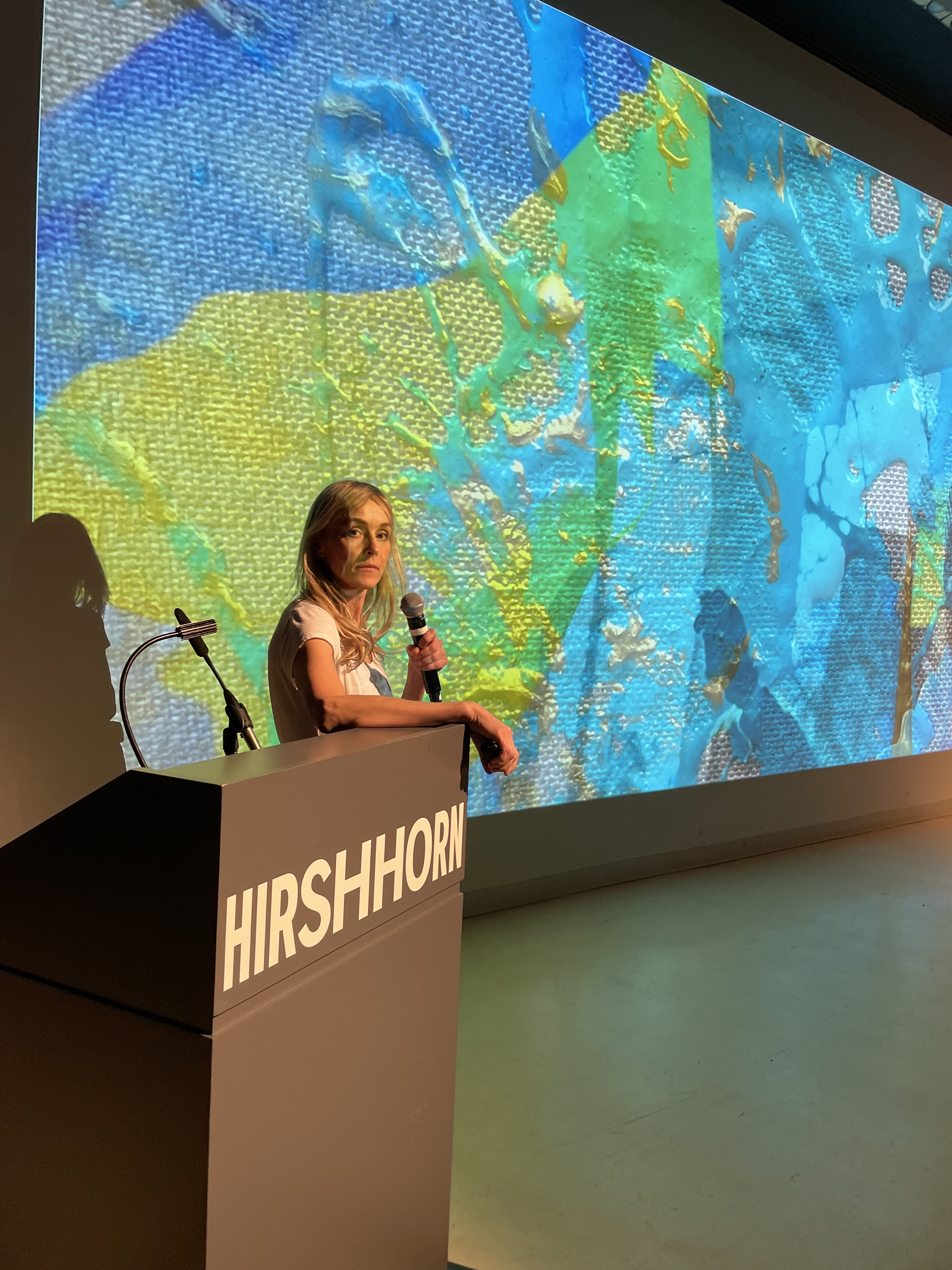
Pilat, Hirshhorn

Agnieszka Pilat (born 1973) is a Polish-American artist and writer working at the intersection of robotics, artificial intelligence, and fine art. She specializes in rendering portraitures of technology to explore the relationship between humans and machines in the 21st century.

== Early life ==
Agnieszka Pilat grew up in Łódź, Poland during the height of the Cold War and witnessed the fall of the Polish People's Republic. Her mother was a gym-teacher, and her father was a pastry chef. In 1989, her father was able to buy the business he operated due to the new policies put forth by the post-Soviet government. Pilat commends this move by her parents as the saving grace of her family; her father's alcoholism slowly reversed after taking on new responsibilities. Her father went on to own several bakeries and successfully transitioned to the implementation of free-trade practices. In 2004, she moved to California to pursue a Bachelor of Fine Arts with an emphasis in illustration and painting. While studying at the Academy of Art University in San Francisco, she developed a passion for portraiture and continues to emphasize this in her contemporary works. She is married to a software engineer.

== Career ==
Following the completion of her degree, Pilat operated a full-time studio in San Francisco where she painted portraits of people and industrial machines. Much of her early work emphasizes the progression of time and the reality of the future. She has been featured in numerous venues and galleries such as the de Young Museum and Modernism. After spending several years in the Bay Area art scene, Pilat began to realize that prolific collectors and industry leaders under-appreciated her technical skills in favor of more abstract pieces.

Pilat's career began to change radically after meeting the developer Paul Stein. As an avid collector of art and salvageable items, Stein asked Pilat to create a custom painting for him, which resulted in the rendering of a vintage fire alarm bell as a portrait. Curiosity over her paintings became more prevalent among tech executives in Silicon Valley. Pilat began to seek out artistic opportunities with Bay Area tech giants and maintained residencies with organizations such as SpaceX, Wrightspeed, Autodesk and Waymo.

Once more commissions came, Pilat began to focus entirely on the representation of machines and devices instead of human portraiture. This newfound passion for cutting-edge technology, combined with interests in the future, led her to a residency with Boston Dynamics. By the Fall of 2020, Pilat had produced a variety of pieces featuring Spot, the yellow-dog-like robot created in Waltham, Massachusetts. While she no longer serves as a guest resident artist for Boston Dynamics, she continues to use the robot as both a source of inspiration and as a co-artist. By using the robot's apparatus to hold and paint with an oil stick, the two have completed a wide array of memorable works, such as a futuristic Madonna (representation of Mary).

Pilat's work has been featured in the fourth Matrix film, Matrix Resurrections, and has been bought by notable collectors including Craig McCaw, Jorn Lyssegen, Yuri Milner, Peter Hirshberg, and Steve Jurvetson. The artist maintains a full-time studio in Chelsea, Manhattan and splits her time between New York and San Francisco.

Pilat has put on numerous shows and exhibitions of her own work. In 2021, she debuted the Renaissance 2.0 solo exhibition at Modernism West in San Francisco, which depicted classic art in modern ways with augmented reality. Following Russia's invasion of Ukraine in February 2022, Pilat completed a painting with the assistance of the Boston Dynamics Spot robot, titled "Sunrise March," which sold for $40,000 at a private charity auction and was subsequently exhibited alongside Poland's Embassy in Washington D.C. at the Hirshhorn Museum, the Smithsonian National Air and Space Museum, and the Strathmore center.

== HETEROBOTA ==
In April 2023, the National Gallery of Victoria in Melbourne, Australia announced Pilat would headline its third NGV Triennial museum exhibition, alongside Yoko Ono, Tracey Emin, and fashion house Schiaparelli, with an installation featuring three Boston Dynamics robots painting autonomously for four months.

Pilat's HETEROBOTA exhibit during the NGV Triennial opened to the public in December 2023, and was attended by celebrities Liam Hemsworth and Gabriella Brooks. HETEROBOTA involved a research component by RMIT wherein academics polled the public's opinion on robots. RMIT chief investigator Brad Crammond said at the time:

“There is no existing research on the scale of this project looking at public sentiment around the desirability of regular and widespread interaction with robots in the community...It will assist us on numerous fronts, from providing insights on community perceptions to catalysing public discourse on themes of robotics in life.”

The National Gallery of Victoria separately commissioned an essay on HETEROBOTA from writer Davis Richardson titled Infinite Horizons that compared the exhibit to Michel Foucault's Heterotopia.

"We arrive instead at a new frontier, where all of what was previously thought ‘genius’ – our mathematics, our poetry, our psychological configurations – is instead subverted into an automated end point. As Pilat has said, ‘If a machine can make your art for you, it begs the uncomfortable question: should you be pursuing art in the first place?’"
