= BigDog =

Quadruped robot built by Boston Dynamics

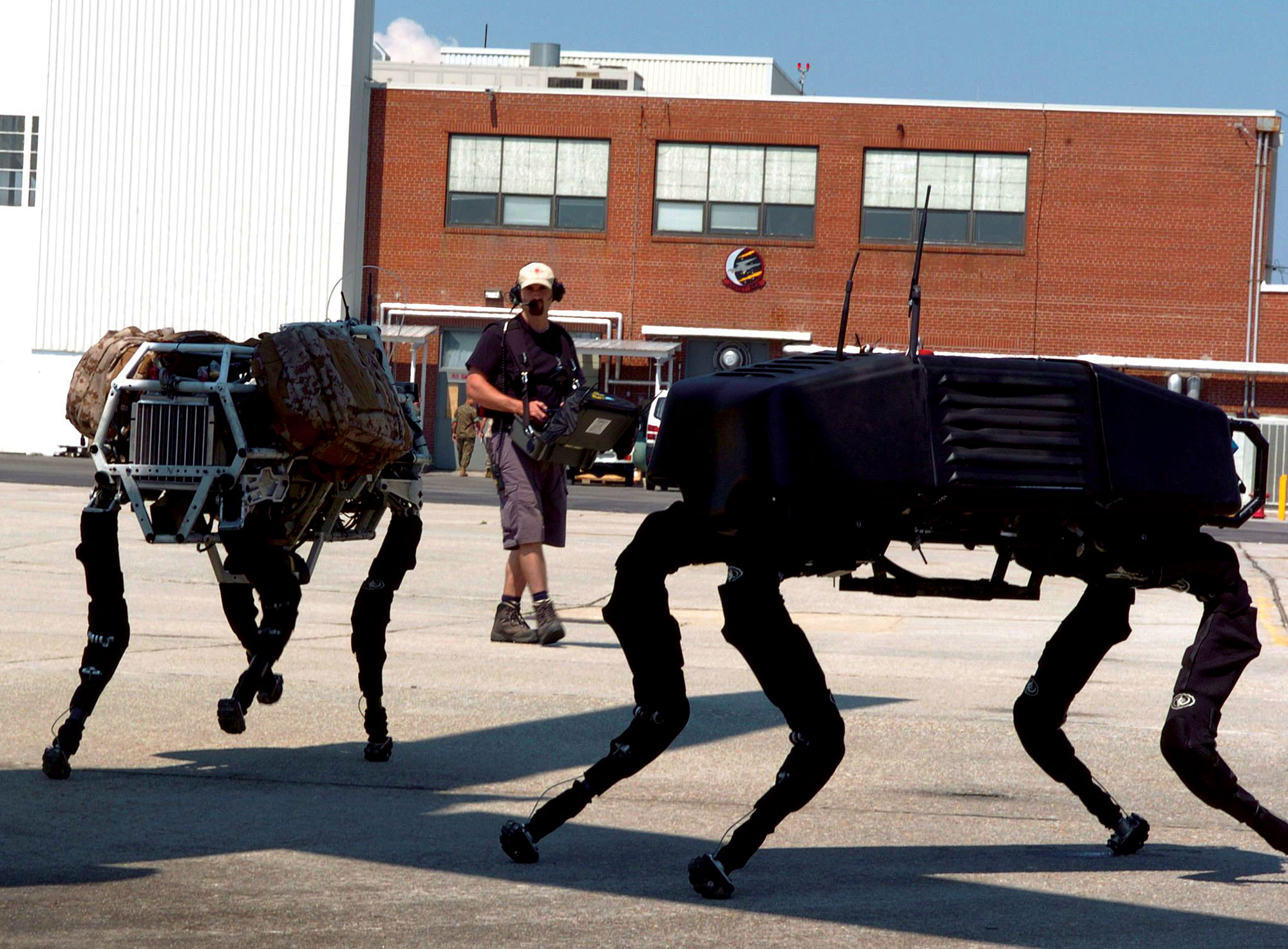
- A pair of BigDog robots
- Manufacturer: Boston Dynamics, Defense Advanced Research Projects Agency, and the Harvard University Concord Field Station
- Year of creation: 2005—2010
- Derived from: MIT LegLab (1984—1999)
- Replaced by: Legged Squad Support System
- Website: www.bostondynamics.com/robot_bigdog.html

BigDog is a dynamically stable quadruped military robot platform that was created in 2005 by Boston Dynamics with the Harvard University Concord Field Station. It was funded by the U.S. Defense Advanced Research Projects Agency (DARPA), but the project was shelved after the BigDog's gas engine was deemed too loud for combat.

== History ==
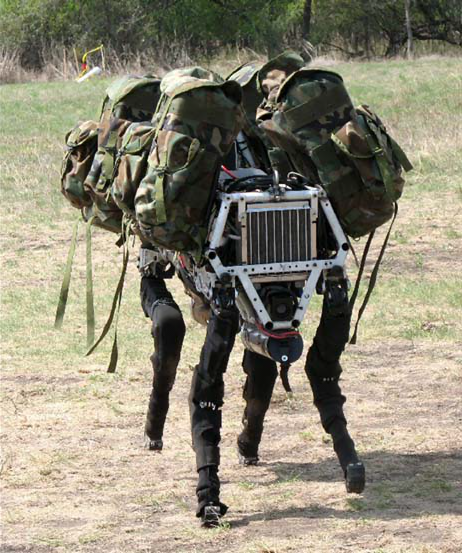
Image from the DARPA Strategic Plan (2007)

BigDog was funded by the Defense Advanced Research Projects Agency (DARPA) in the hopes that it would be able to serve as a mechanic pack mule to accompany soldiers in terrain too rough for conventional vehicles. Instead of wheels or treads, BigDog uses four legs for movement, allowing it to move across surfaces that would be difficult for wheels. The legs contain a variety of sensors, including joint position and ground contact. BigDog also features a laser gyroscope and a stereo vision system.

BigDog is 3 feet (0.91 m) long, stands 2.5 feet (0.76 m) tall, and weighs 240 pounds (110 kg), making it about the size of a small mule. It is capable of traversing difficult terrain, running at four miles per hour (6.4 km/h), carrying 340 pounds (150 kg), and climbing a 35 degree incline. Locomotion is controlled by an onboard computer that receives input from the robot's various sensors. Navigation and balance are also managed by the control system.

BigDog's walking pattern is controlled through four legs, each equipped with four low-friction hydraulic cylinder actuators that power the joints. BigDog's locomotion behaviors can vary greatly. It can stand up, sit down, walk with a crawling gait that lifts one leg at a time, walk with a trotting gait lifting diagonal legs, or trot with a running gait. The travel speed of BigDog varies from a 0.62 mph (1 km/h) crawl to a 3.3 mph (5.3 km/h) trot.

The BigDog project was headed by Dr. Martin Buehler, who received the Joseph Engelberger Award from the Robotics Industries Association in 2012 for the work. Dr. Buehler while previously a professor at McGill University, headed the robotics lab there, developing four-legged walking and running robots.

Built onto the actuators are sensors for joint position and force, and movement is ultimately controlled through an onboard computer which manages the sensors.

Approximately 50 sensors are located on BigDog. These measure the attitude and acceleration of the body, motion, and force of joint actuators as well as engine speed, temperature and hydraulic pressure inside the robot's internal engine. Low-level control, such as position and force of the joints, and high-level control such as velocity and altitude during locomotion, are both controlled through the onboard computer.

BigDog was featured in episodes of Web Junk 20 and Hungry Beast, and in articles in New Scientist, Popular Science, Popular Mechanics, and The Wall Street Journal.

In September 2011 Boston Dynamics released video footage of a new generation of BigDog known as AlphaDog. The footage shows AlphaDog's ability to walk on rough terrain and recover its balance when kicked from the side.

The refined equivalent has been designed by Boston Dynamics to exceed BigDog in terms of capabilities and use to dismounted soldiers.

In February 2012, with further DARPA support, the militarized Legged Squad Support System (LS3) variant of BigDog demonstrated its capabilities during a hike over a rough terrain.

Starting in the summer of 2012, DARPA planned to complete the overall development of the system and refine its key capabilities in 18 months, ensuring its worth to dismounted warfighters before it is rolled out to squads operating in-theatre. BigDog must be able to demonstrate its ability to complete a 20-mile (32 km) trail in 24 hours, without refuelling, while carrying a 325-pound (150 kg) load. A refinement of its vision sensors will also be conducted.

At the end of February 2013, Boston Dynamics released video footage of a modified BigDog with an arm. The arm could pick up objects and throw them. The robot is relying on its legs and torso to help power the motions of the arm. It is believed that it can lift weights around 55 pounds (25 kg). This work was funded by the United States Army Research Laboratory and paved the way for integrating manipulators with quadrupeds as found on Spot, the spiritual successor of BigDog.

=== Discontinuation ===
At the end of December 2013, the BigDog project was discontinued. Despite hopes that it would one day work like a pack mule for US soldiers in the field, the gasoline-powered engine was deemed too noisy for use in combat, and it could be heard from hundreds of meters away. A similar project in 2016 for an all-electric robot, named Spot, was much quieter, but could only carry 45 pounds (20 kg). Both projects are no longer in progress, but Spot was released in 2020.

== Hardware ==
BigDog is powered by a small two-stroke, one-cylinder, 15-brake-horsepower (11 kW) engine operating at 9,000 RPM. The engine drives a hydraulic pump, which in turn drives the hydraulic leg actuators. Each leg has four actuators (two for the hip joint, and two each for the knee and ankle joints), for a total of 16. Each actuator unit consists of a hydraulic cylinder, servo valve, position sensor, and force sensor.

Onboard computing power is a ruggedized PC/104 board stack with two computers, one running a Pentium M processor running QNX (used for sensor data processing) and another running a Core Duo processor (used for visual data processing).

== Gallery ==
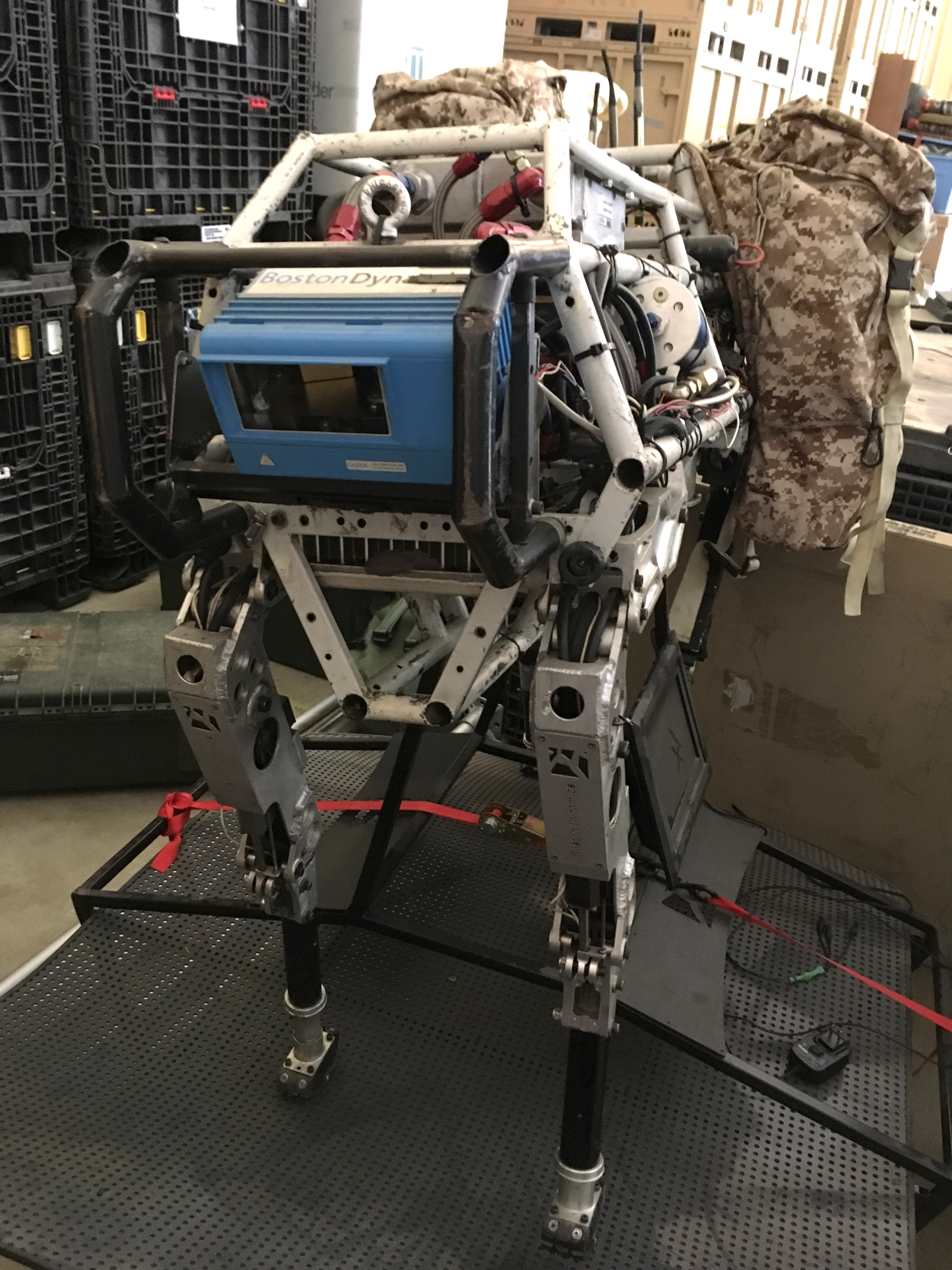

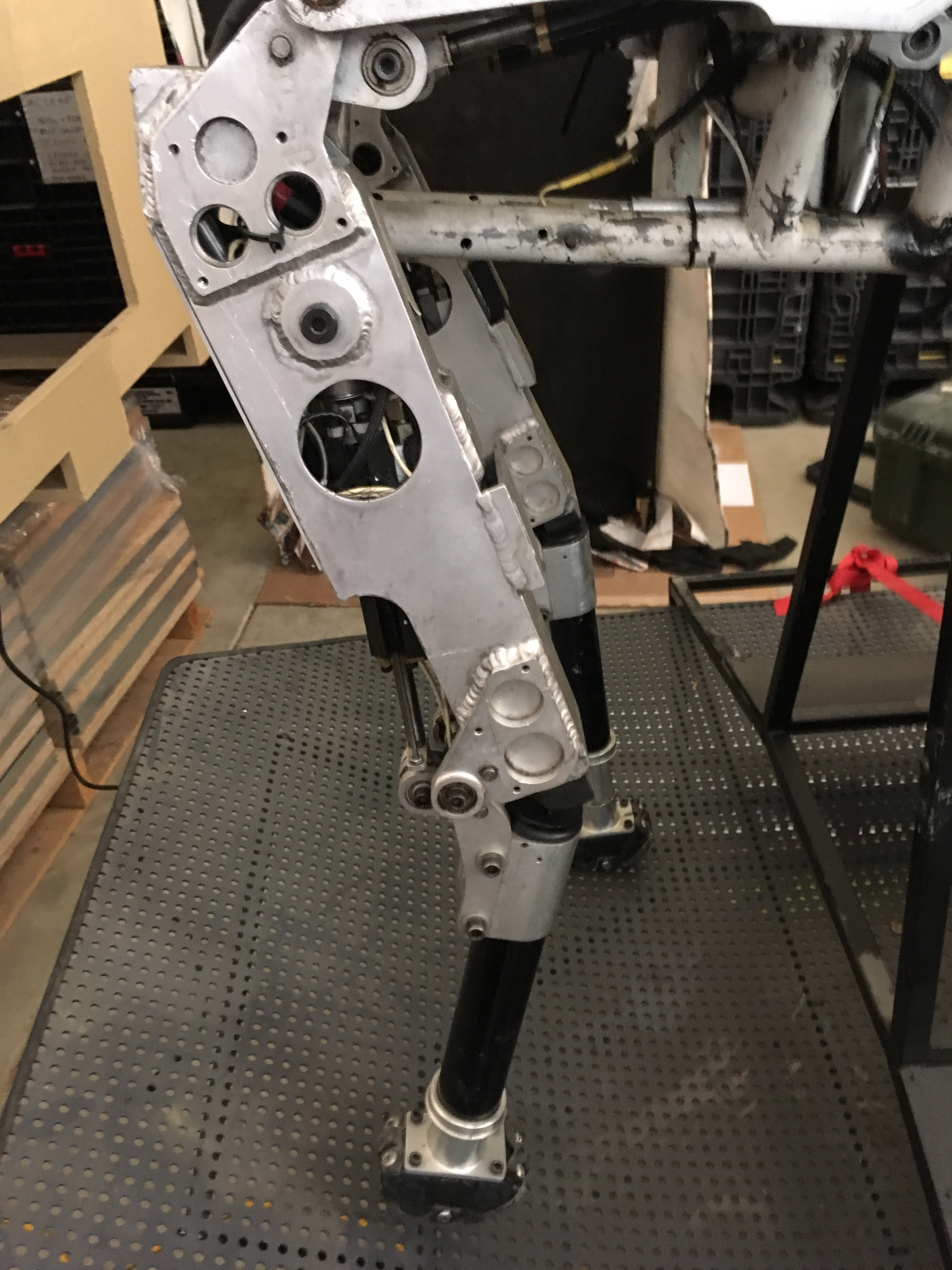

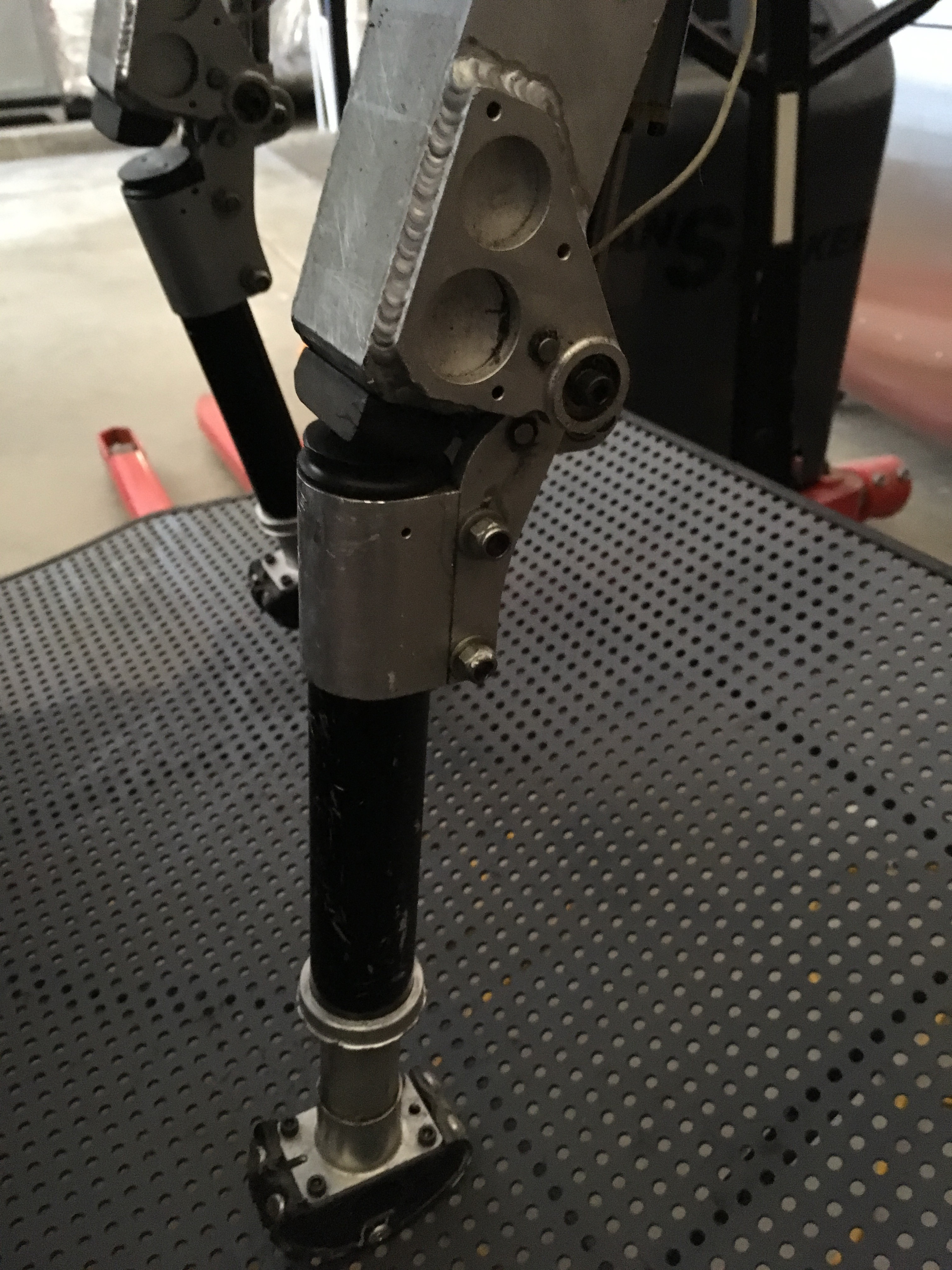

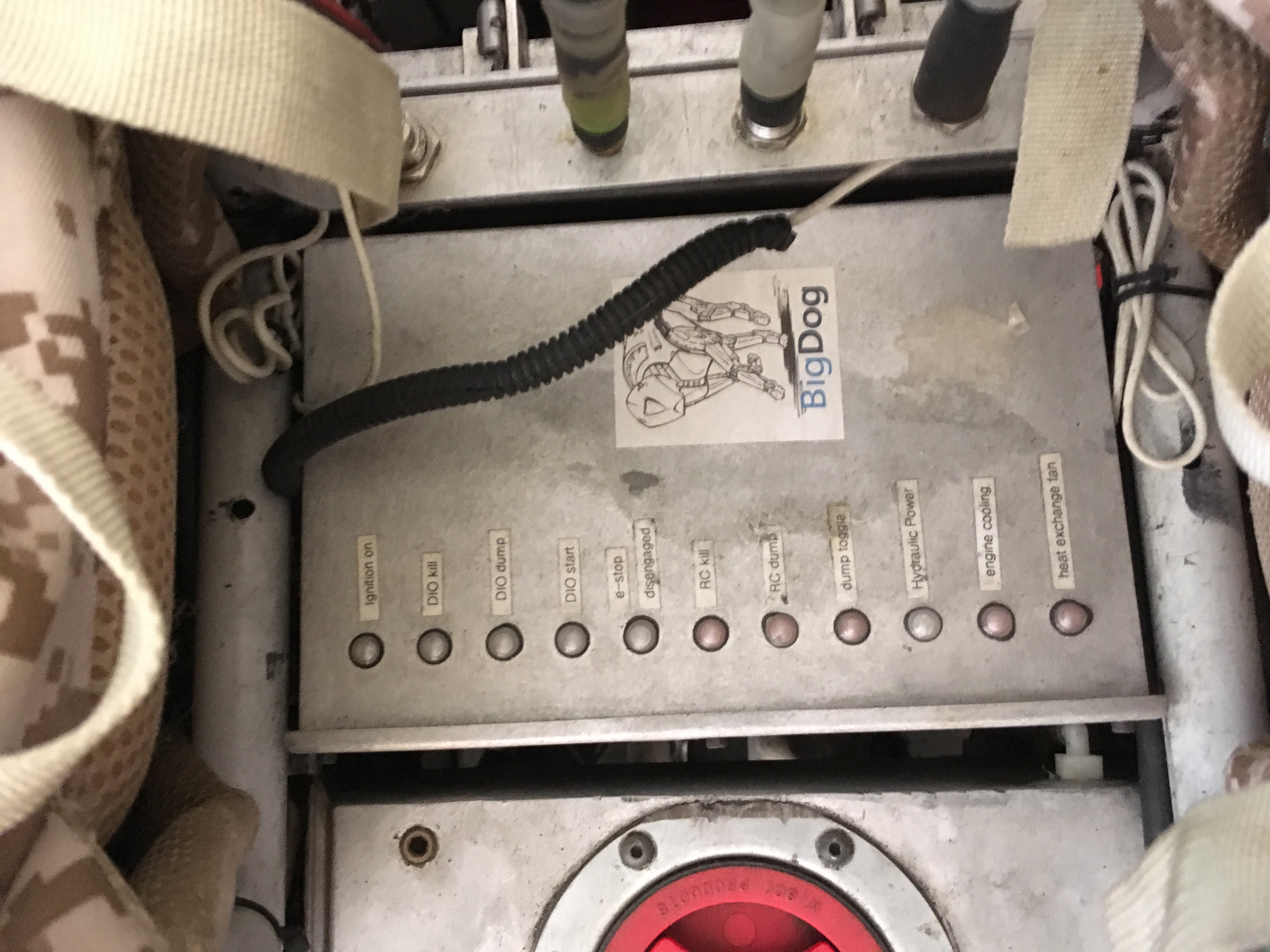

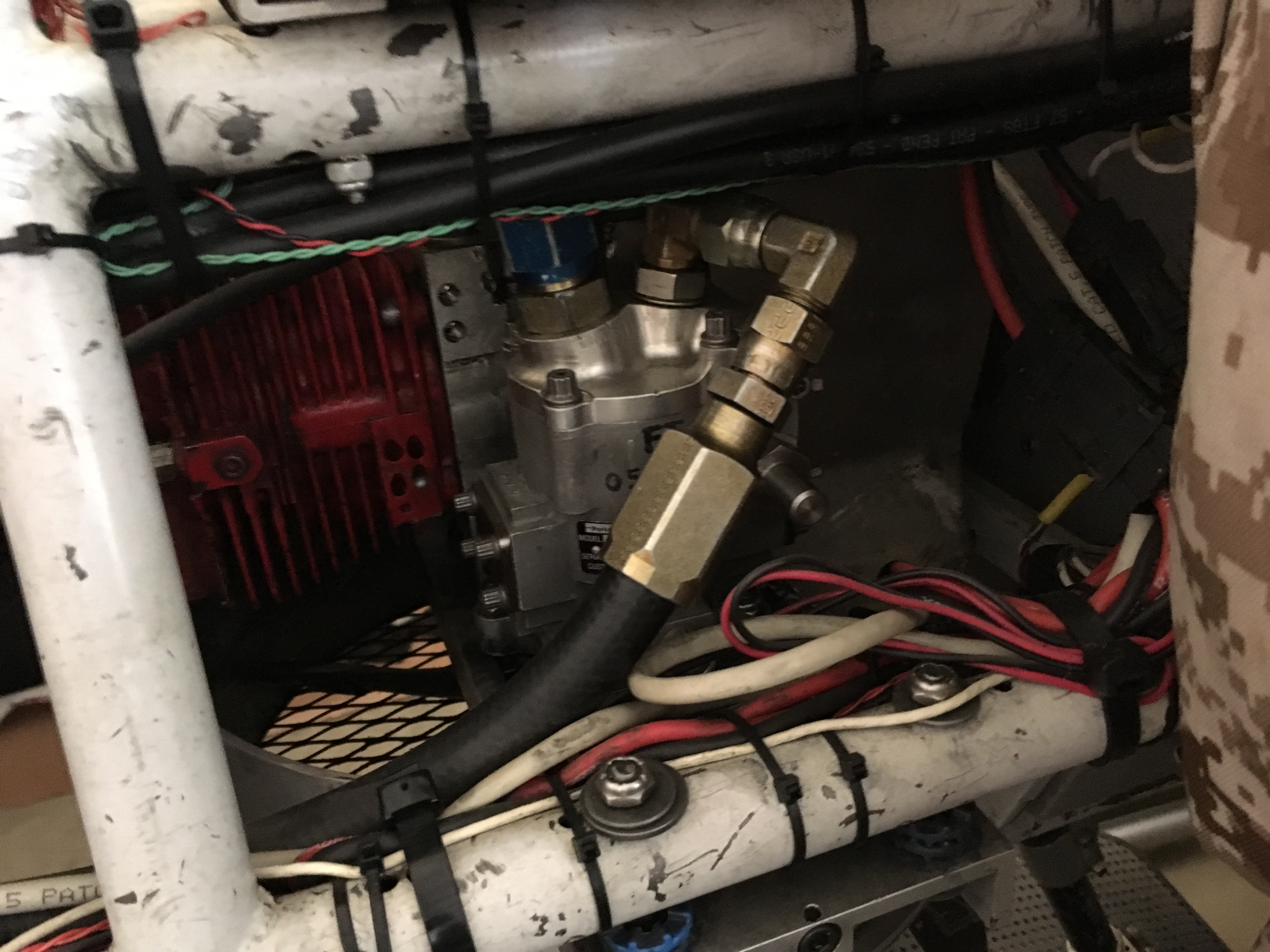

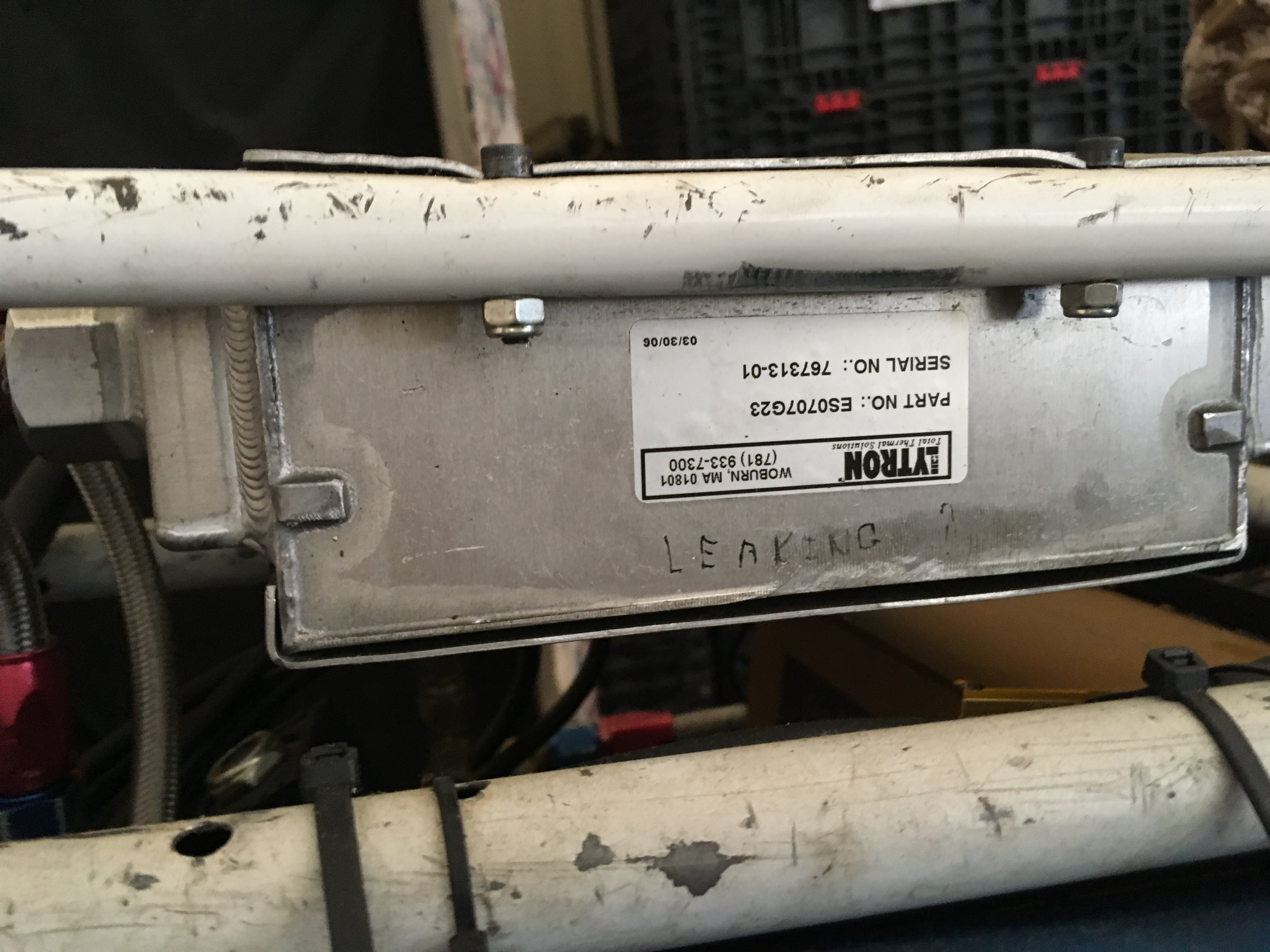

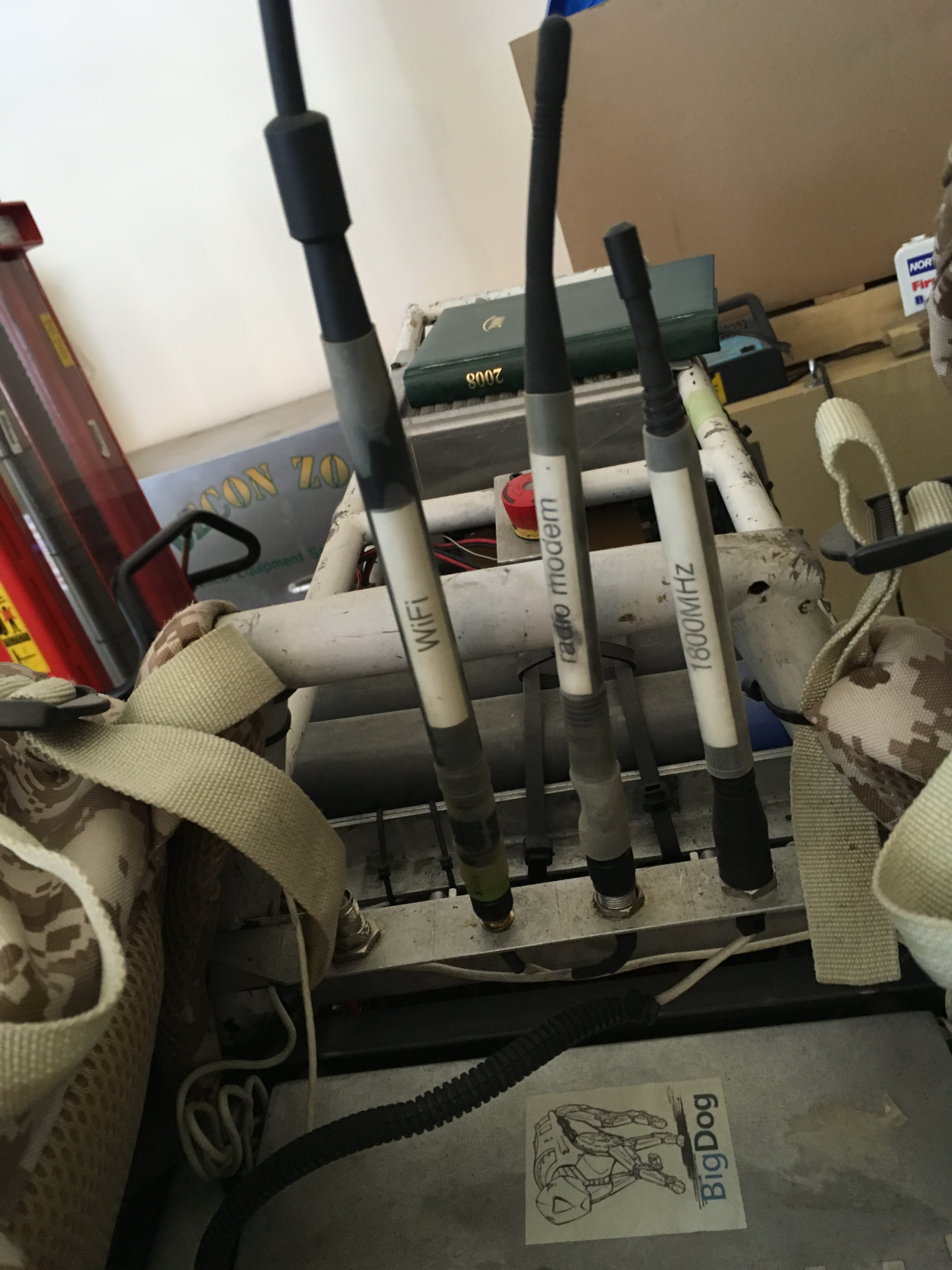

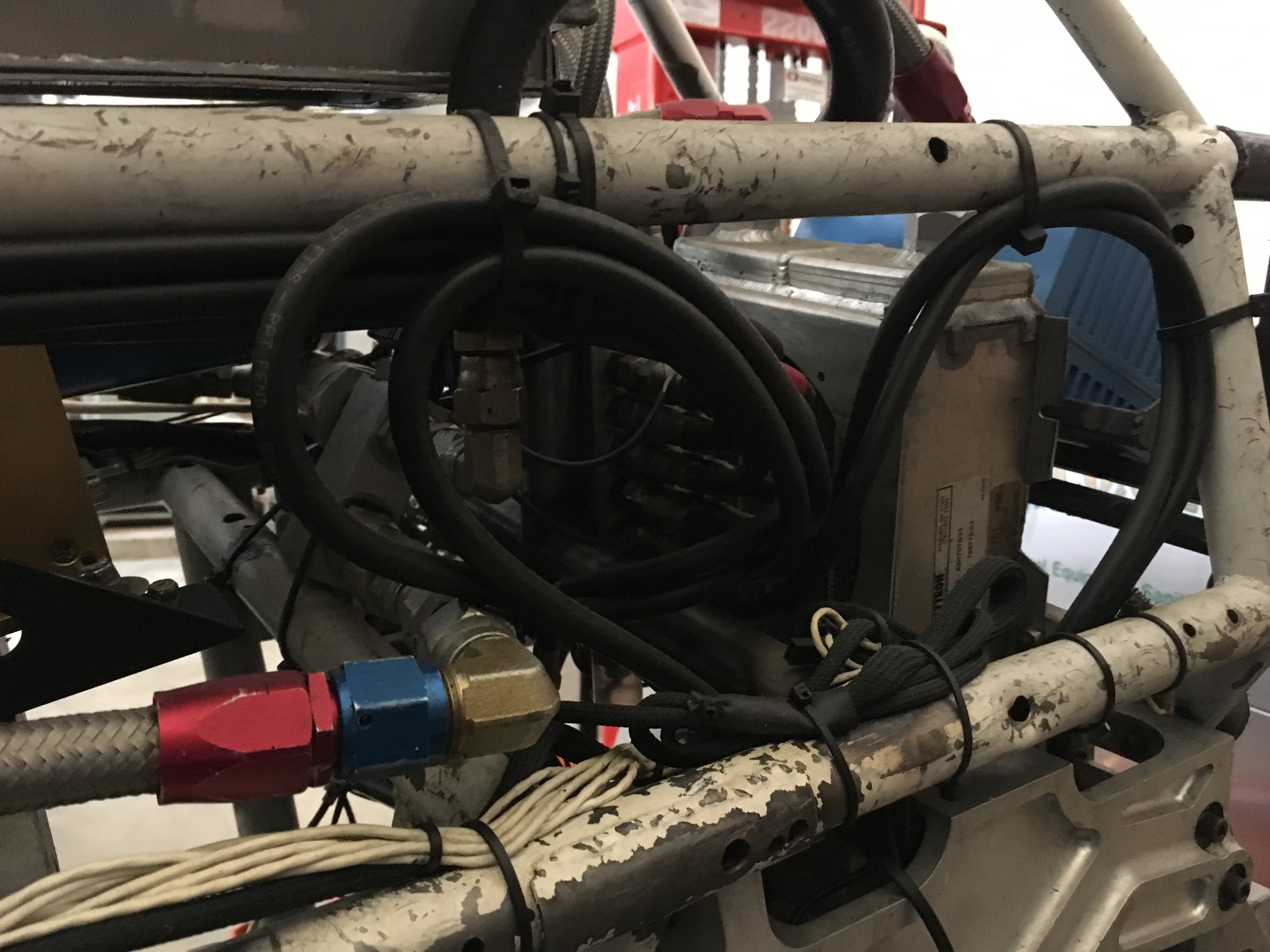

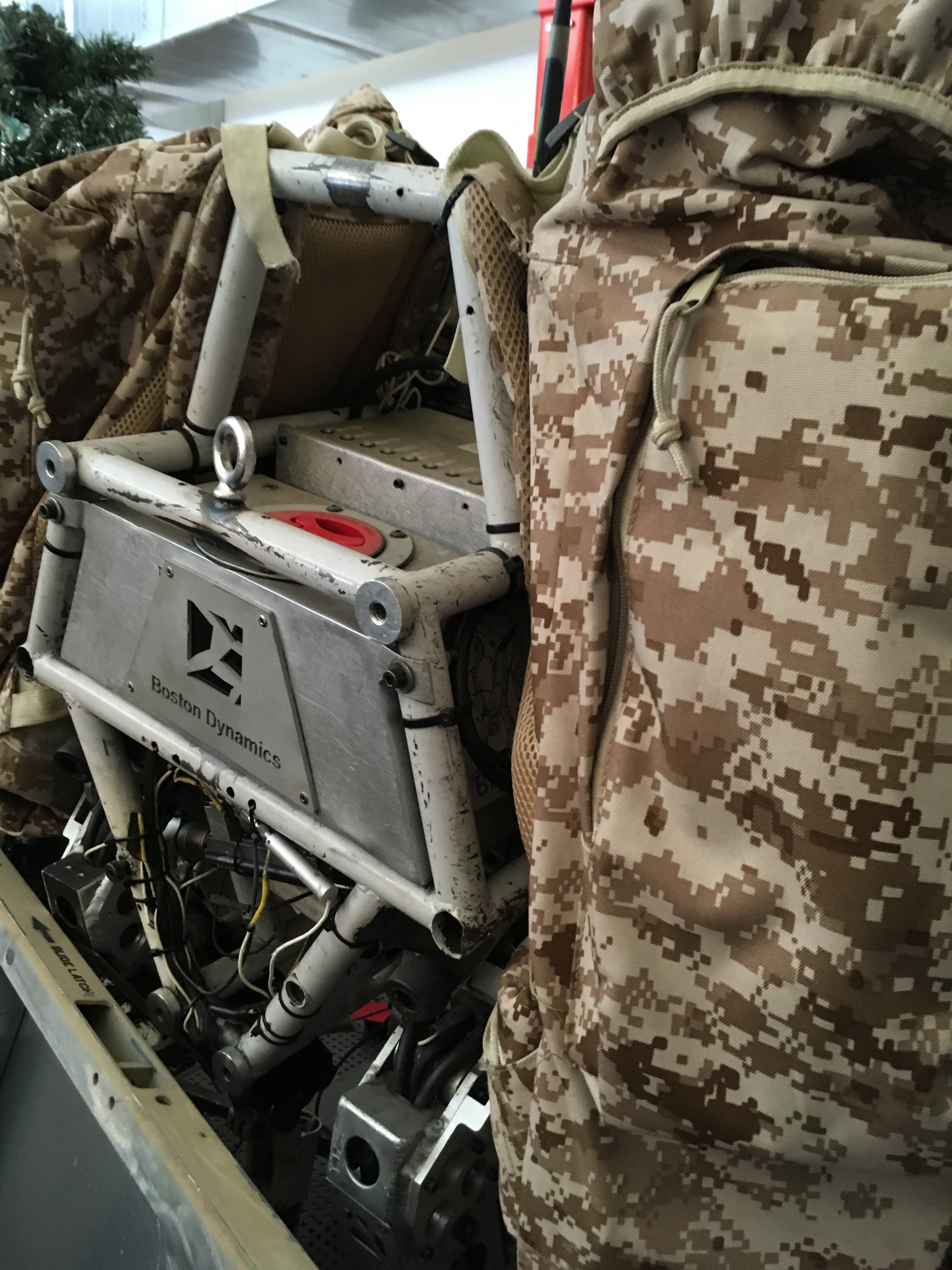

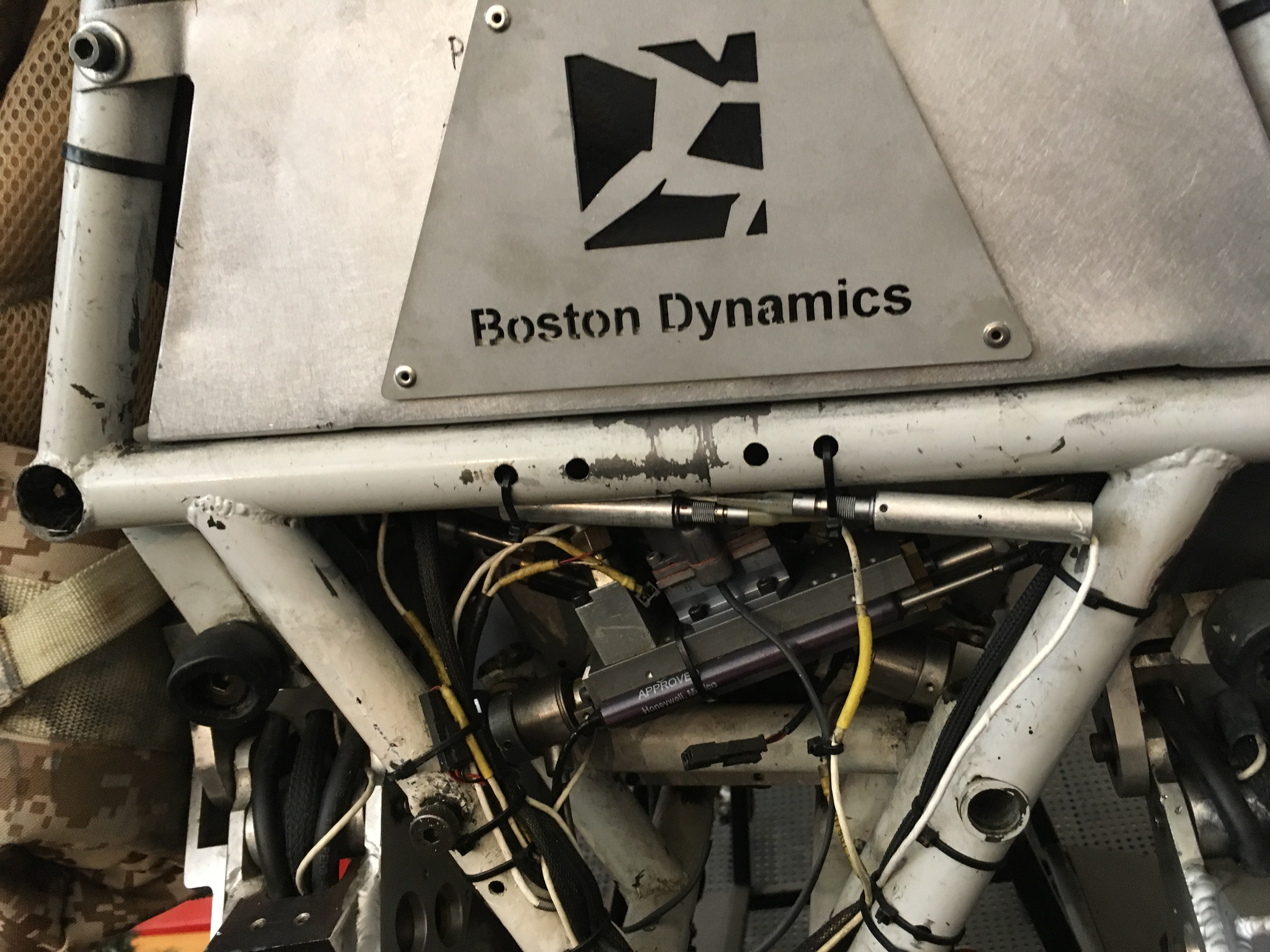

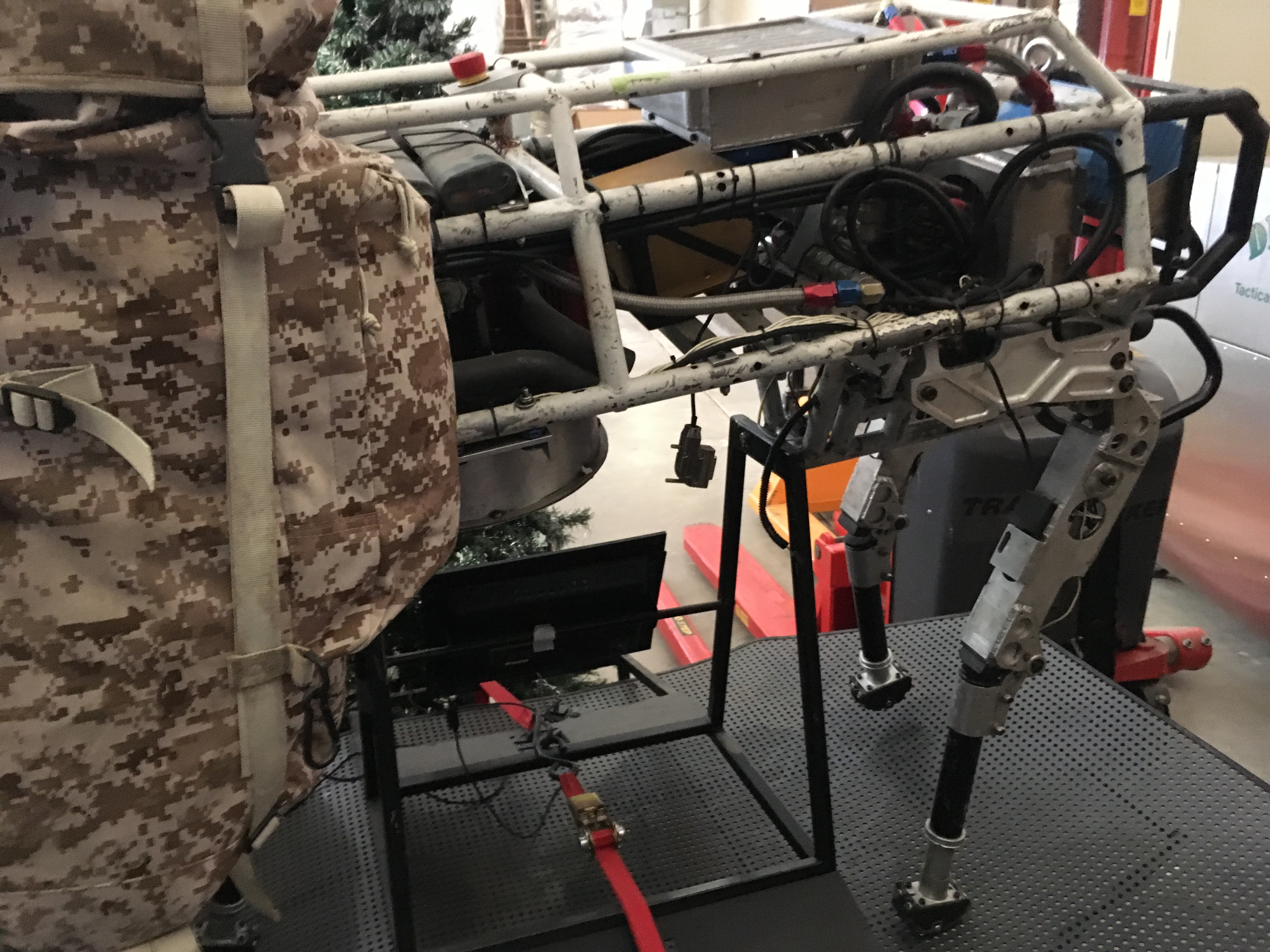

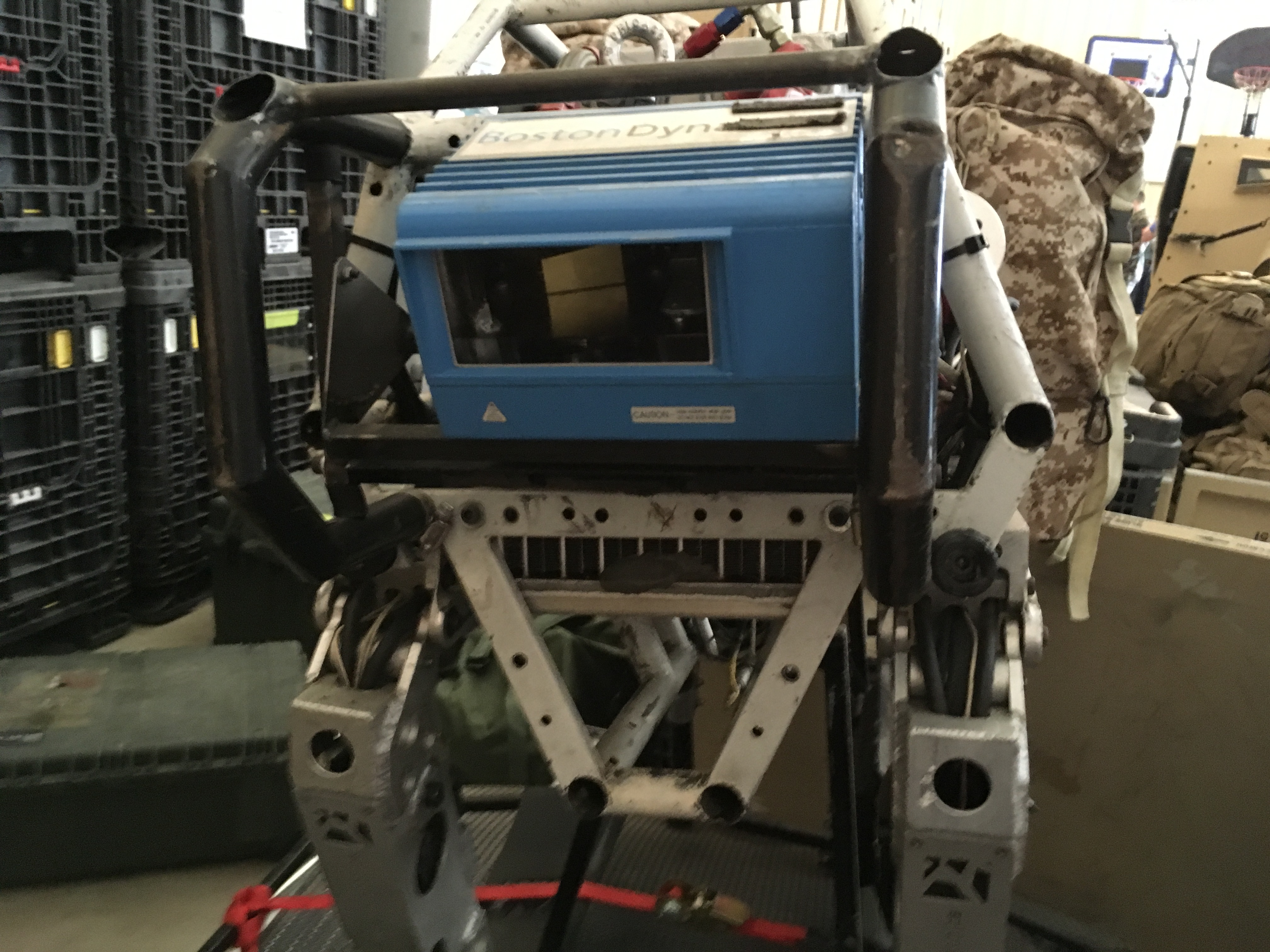

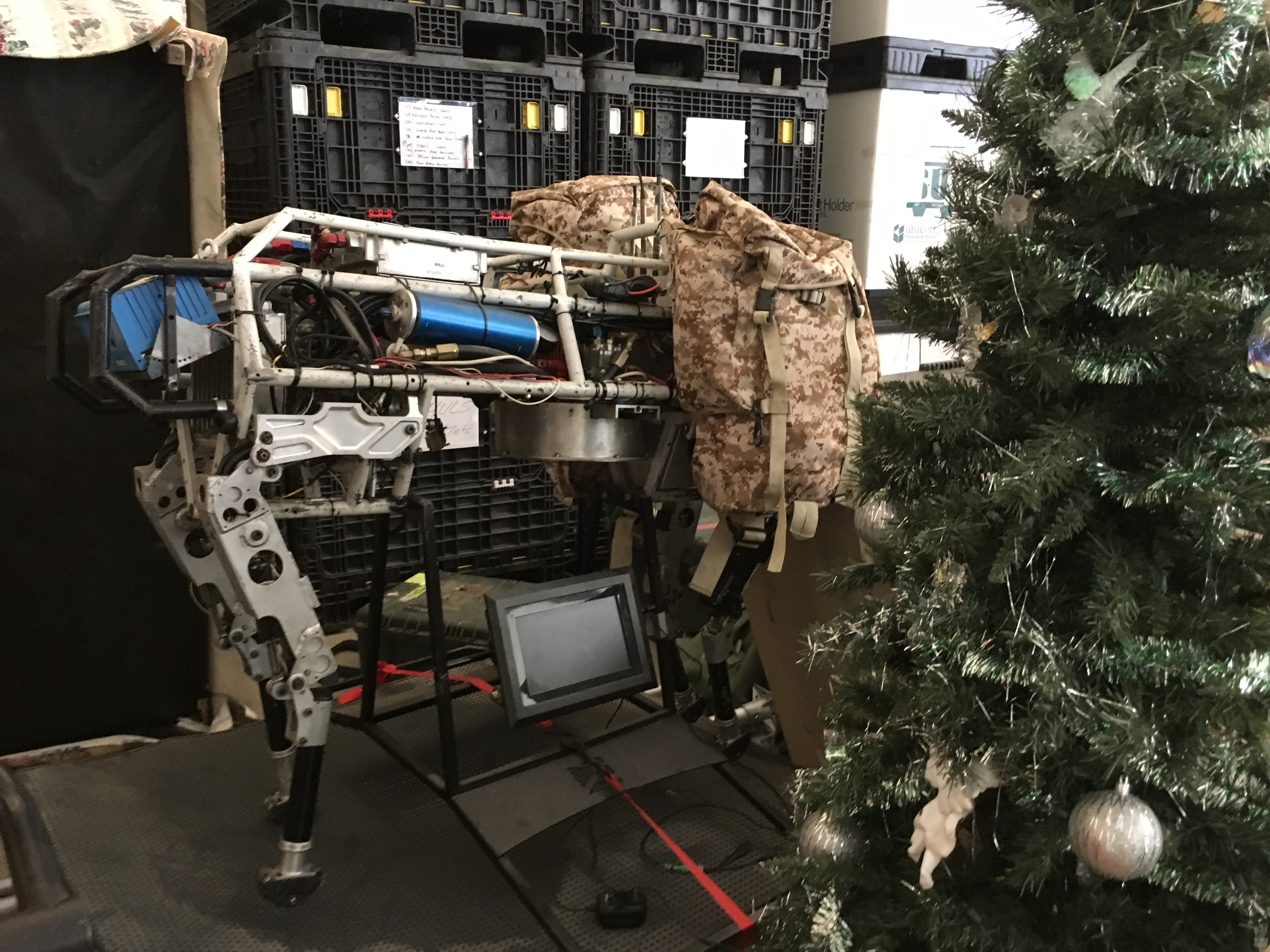

== See also ==
- Aibo
- Biorobotics
- Legged Squad Support System, the next phase of the BigDog project
