= Boston Dynamics =

US engineering and robotics design company

Boston Dynamics, Inc.
- Type: Subsidiary
- Industry: Robotics; Artificial intelligence Automation
- Founded: 1992; 34 years ago
- Founder: Marc Raibert
- Headquarters: Waltham, Massachusetts, United States
- Number of employees: 1,000
- Parent: Google X (2013–2017); SoftBank Group (2017–2020); Hyundai Motor Group (2020–present)
- Website: bostondynamics.com

Boston Dynamics, Inc. is an American engineering and robotics design company founded in 1992 as a spin-off from the Massachusetts Institute of Technology. Headquartered in Waltham, Massachusetts, Boston Dynamics has been owned by the Hyundai Motor Group since December 2020, which completed the acquisition in June 2021.

Boston Dynamics develops a series of dynamic, highly mobile robots, including BigDog, Spot, Atlas, and Handle. In 2019, Spot became its first commercially available robot after years of exclusively being a defense contractor. The company has stated its intent to commercialize its other military robots, including Handle.

== History ==
The company was founded by Marc Raibert, who spun the company off from the Massachusetts Institute of Technology in 1992. The company was an outgrowth of the Leg Laboratory, Raibert's research lab at MIT and Carnegie Mellon University. The Leg Laboratory assisted with establishing the scientific basis for highly dynamic robots. These robots were inspired by the remarkable ability of animals to move with agility, dexterity, perception, and intelligence, and the work there set the stage for the robots developed at Boston Dynamics. Nancy Cornelius was a co-founder of Boston Dynamics, having joined the company as its first employee. While employed at the company, she served as a Boston Dynamics officer, conducted engineering on many contracts, was CFO for 10 years, and later was VP in charge of engineering on several contracts. She retired after 21 years of service in 2013, when the company was acquired by Google. Robert Playter was also a co-founder of the company, joining a few months later, as soon as he completed his PhD thesis at MIT, working with Raibert in the Leg Laboratory. Playter was COO at the company for many years and has been CEO since 2019.

Early in the company's history, it worked with the American Systems Corporation under a contract from the Naval Air Warfare Center Training Systems Division (NAWCTSD) to replace naval training videos for aircraft launch operations with interactive 3D computer simulations featuring characters made with DI-Guy, software for realistic human simulation. Eventually, the company began manufacturing physical robots—for example, BigDog was a quadruped robot designed for the U.S. military with funding from Defense Advanced Research Projects Agency (DARPA).

On December 13, 2013, the company was acquired by Google X (later X, a subsidiary of Alphabet Inc.) for an unknown price, where it was managed by Andy Rubin until he departed from Google in 2014. Immediately before the acquisition, Boston Dynamics transferred their DI-Guy software product line to VT MÄK, a simulation software vendor based in Cambridge, Massachusetts.

On June 8, 2017, Alphabet Inc. announced the sale of the company to Japan's SoftBank Group for an undisclosed sum. On April 2, 2019, Boston Dynamics acquired the Silicon Valley startup Kinema Systems.

In November 2020, the firm signed an agreement with Trimble Inc. to further develop the Spot dog product.

In December 2020, Hyundai Motor Group acquired an 80% stake in the company from SoftBank for approximately $880 million. SoftBank Group retains about 20% through an affiliate. In June 2021, it was announced that Hyundai officially took a controlling stake in the company from SoftBank.

In October 2022, the company signed a pledge saying it would not support any weaponization of its robotic creations. Boston Dynamics offered other robotics companies to join the pledge, with five other firms signing as well.

In February 2026, Robert Playter stepped down as CEO, announcing his retirement after being with the company since 1994. Amanda McMaster, the CFO of Boston Dynamics was announced as Interim CEO. In October 2026, Boston Dynamics named Rohit Prasad, who led AI development at Amazon, as its new CEO.

== Products ==
=== BigDog ===
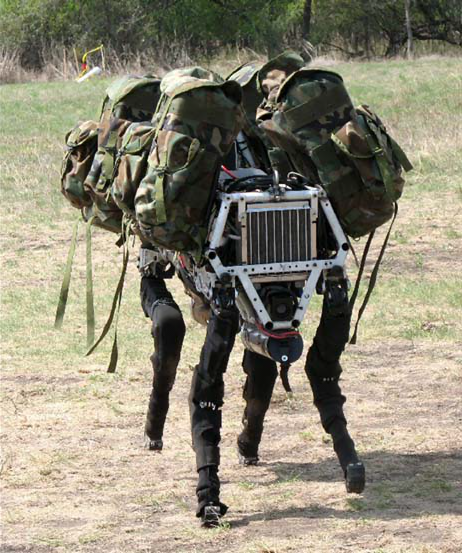
BigDog

BigDog was a quadrupedal robot created in 2005 by Boston Dynamics, in conjunction with Foster-Miller, the Jet Propulsion Laboratory, and the Harvard University Concord Field Station. It was funded by DARPA in the hopes that it would be able to serve as a robotic pack mule to accompany soldiers in terrain too rough for vehicles, but the project was shelved after BigDog was deemed too loud to be used in combat. Instead of wheels, BigDog used four legs for movement, allowing it to move across surfaces that would defeat wheels. Called "the world's most ambitious legged robot", it was designed to carry 340 pounds (150 kg) alongside a soldier at 4 miles per hour (6.4 km/h; 1.8 m/s), traversing rough terrain at inclines up to 35 degrees.

=== Cheetah ===
The Cheetah is a four-footed robot that gallops at 28 miles per hour (45 km/h; 13 m/s), which as of August 2012 is a land speed record for legged robots.

A similar but independently developed robot, also known as Cheetah, has been manufactured by MIT's Biomimetic Robotics Lab, which, by 2014, could jump over obstacles while running. By 2018, the robot was able to climb stairs.

=== LittleDog ===
Released around 2010, LittleDog is a small quadruped robot developed for DARPA by Boston Dynamics for research. Unlike BigDog, which is run by Boston Dynamics, LittleDog is intended as a testbed for other institutions. Boston Dynamics maintains the robots for DARPA as a standard platform.

LittleDog has four legs, each powered by three electric motors. The legs have a large range of motion. The robot is strong enough for climbing and dynamic locomotion gaits. The onboard PC-level computer does sensing, actuator control, and communications. LittleDog's sensors measure joint angles, motor currents, body orientation, and foot/ground contact. Control programs access the robot through the Boston Dynamics Robot API. Onboard lithium polymer batteries allow for 30 minutes of continuous operation without recharging. Wireless communications and data logging support remote operation and data analysis. LittleDog development is funded by the DARPA Information Processing Technology Office.

=== PETMAN ===
PETMAN (Protection Ensemble Test Mannequin) is a bipedal device constructed for testing chemical protection suits. It is the first anthropomorphic robot that moves dynamically like a person.

=== LS3 ===
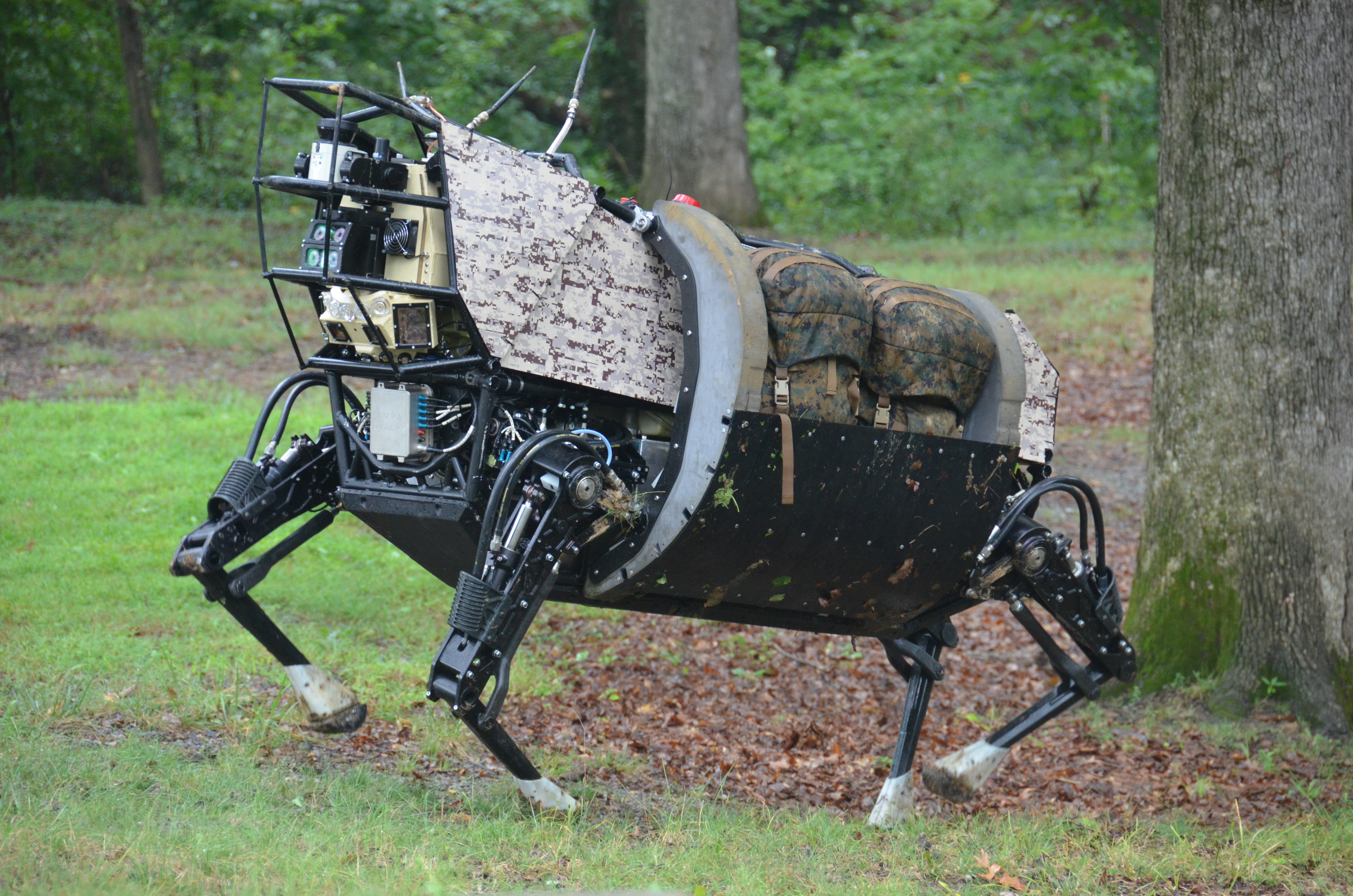
LS3 2012 prototype

Legged Squad Support System (LS3), also known as AlphaDog, is a militarized version of BigDog. It is ruggedized for military use, capable of operating in hot, cold, wet, and dirty environments.

According to Lt. Col. Joe Hitt and the US Marine Corps's program manager, "The vision for LS3 is to combine the capabilities of a pack mule with the intelligence of a trained animal." LS3 is capable of reacting to visual or oral commands and utilizes an on-board GPS system, along with computer vision (LIDAR and IR), to guide itself through terrain. Due to its ability to track oral commands, soldiers within the field found it difficult to hold a conversation with this bot in a vicinity because it would unknowingly follow commands not given to itself. Unlike its living counterparts, LS3 can march for 20 miles (32 km) before running out of fuel. The robot is also more resistant to injury and disability and does not suffer from the shortcomings of bleeding and falling over, the historical weaknessess of mules and other military animals.

=== Atlas ===
The Agile Anthropomorphic Robot "Atlas" is a 5-foot (152.4 cm) bipedal humanoid robot, based on Boston Dynamics' earlier PETMAN humanoid robot, and designed for a variety of search and rescue tasks.

In February 2016, Boston Dynamics published a YouTube video entitled "Atlas, The Next Generation" showing a new humanoid robot about 5 feet tall (152.4 cm). In the video, the robot is shown performing several tasks that would have been difficult or impossible for the previous generation of humanoid robots.

A video posted to the Boston Dynamics channel of YouTube, dated October 11, 2018, titled "Parkour Atlas", shows the robot easily running up 2-foot high steps onto a platform. Atlas is shown in a September 2019 YouTube video doing "More Parkour".

In April 2024, the company announced that they had retired the hydraulic-based Atlas in favor of a new all-electric version of Atlas.

=== Handle ===
Handle is a research robot with two flexible legs on wheels and two "hands" for manipulating or carrying objects. It can stand 6.5 feet (2 m) tall, travel at 9 miles per hour (14 km/h), and jump 4 feet (1.2 m) vertically. It utilizes electric power to operate various electric and hydraulic actuators, with a range of approximately 15 miles (25 km) on one battery charge. Handle uses many of the same dynamics, balance, and mobile manipulation principles found in the other robots by Boston Dynamics; however, with only about 10 actuated joints, it is significantly less complex.

=== Stretch ===
On March 29, 2021, Boston Dynamics announced via a video on their YouTube channel the Stretch robot that was designed for warehouse automation. It has a square mobile base containing a set of wheels, a “perception mast” with cameras and other sensors, and a robotic arm with seven degrees of freedom and a suction pad array on the end that can grab and move boxes up to 23 kilograms (50 lbs) in weight.

=== Pick ===
Pick is a robot just like Stretch, but fixed in a particular place. It is designed to carry boxes. It can identify a box in less than a second. It automatically disposes of the sheet of cardboard in between stacks of boxes.

=== Spot ===
In a 2018 viral promotional video, a rear part of Spot's casing falls off as it compensates to overcome interference.

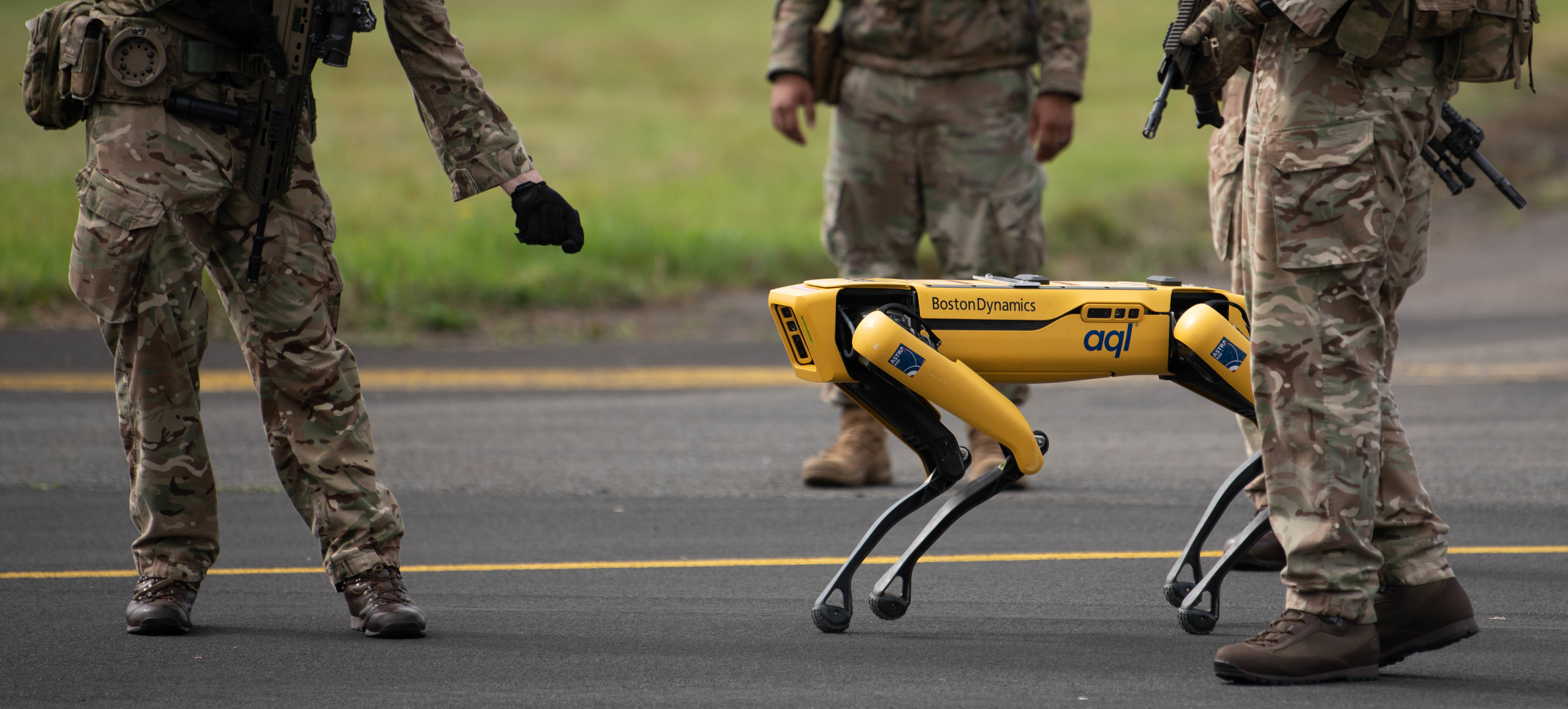
Spot being tested alongside British Royal Air Force service members

On June 23, 2016, Boston Dynamics revealed the four-legged canine-inspired Spot, weighing 25 kg (55 pounds), which was lighter than their other products. Spot was designed to travel over terrain or environments that were previously difficult for other robots.

In November 2017, a promotional video of Spot using its forward claw to open a door for another robot reached #1 on YouTube, with over 2 million views. A later video, released the same month, showed Spot persisting in attempting to open the door in the face of human interference. Viewers perceived the robot as "creepy" and "reminiscent of all kinds of sci-fi robots that wouldn't give up in their missions to seek and destroy."

On 11 May 2018, Boston Dynamics CEO Marc Raibert announced at TechCrunch Robotics Session 2018 that Spot was in pre-production and preparing for commercial availability in 2019. The company said it had plans with contract manufacturers to build the first 100 Spots later that year for commercial purposes, with them starting to scale production with the goal of selling Spot in 2019. However, in September 2019, journalists were informed that the robots will not be sold, but they will be leased to selected business partners. In November 2019 Massachusetts State Police became the first law enforcement agency to use Spot as a robot cop, as well as in the unit's bomb squad.

Since January 2020, Spot's software development kit has been available via GitHub. It allows programmers to develop custom applications for Spot to do various actions that could be used across different industries. On 16 June 2020, Boston Dynamics made Spot available for the general public for US$74,500 (equivalent to $92,682 in 2025).

In June 2020, a lone Spot named 'Zeus' was used by SpaceX at their Boca Chica Starship Test Site to help contain sub-cooled liquid nitrogen and to inspect 'potentially dangerous' sites at and around the launchpad.

In July 2020, a team of Spot robots performed as cheerleaders in the stands at a baseball match between the Fukuoka SoftBank Hawks and the Rakuten Eagles, backed by a team of SoftBank Pepper Robots.

In November 2020, a Spot robot performed inspection tasks on the Skarv floating production storage and offloading vessel.

In February 2021, arts collective MSCHF purchased a Spot robot and placed it in an art gallery with a paintball gun attached to its back in a drop titled "Spot's Rampage". The robot could be controlled by visitors to the website to destroy the art around it. The robot was shut down through an undisclosed backdoor by Boston Dynamics.

In April 2021, Michael Reeves made a YouTube video where he attached a pressurized beer canister and nozzle to a Spot robot in order to detect red plastic cups and dispense beer into them.

In March 2022, artist Agnieszka Pilat sold a painting created by Spot for $40,000 at the home of Brian Boitano to benefit Ukrainian refugees. The painting, titled "Sunrise March," was created by applying paint on Spot's feet and having the robot rotate in circles.

In February 2024, drivers on the M5 motorway in England were warned they should not be alarmed if they saw a Spot operating alongside the road. The National Highways administration had trialed one "as an alternative to human inspectors".

==== Factory Safety Service Robot ====
The Factory Safety Service Robot was unveiled on September 17, 2021. It was the first joint venture with Hyundai Motor Group. The robot is based on the existing Boston Dynamics robot Spot. Its integrated thermal camera and 3D LiDAR system help detect nearby people, monitor fire hazards, and recognize open and closed doors.

== Customization of Spot robots for use by ICE ==
In September of 2026, the United States Department of Homeland Security announced a plan to purchase Boston Dynamics "Spot" robot dogs for use by ICE. DHS said the robots could help improve officer safety and decision-making in incidents involving dangerous, confined, unstable, or otherwise difficult-to-access areas. A federal contract document showed that the $1.3 million deal for four robots was with a Connecticut company, Radeco, which modifies the robots for ICE with military grade add-ons that include a robotic arm, thermal camera, and sensors for explosive materials. Contract language specified that the robots would improve safety and effectiveness for officers during “public safety, law enforcement, immigration enforcement, detention, and investigative missions.” A Boston Dynamics spokesperson quoted in The Boston Globe said “any suggestion that these robots will be used to support immigrant detentions or deportations is false,” and that the language in the contract is “boilerplate.”

The association with ICE provoked strong reactions from members of the community and employees. When news of the sale of Boston Dynamics robots was made public, a protest against the sale was quickly organized to be held on September 19th, 2026 outside Boston's Museum of Science where there is a popular exhibit of Boston Dynamic's Spot robot. In October, 2026 there were two protests held outside the company's headquarters in Waltham, Massachusetts timed to attract the attention of employees as they were leaving the campus for the day.

On September 8, 2026 group of about 300 employees sent a petition to Boston Dynamics leadership urging cancellation of the sale and which said in part "“We cannot be proud of working at BD when that work is being used by a government agency that brutalizes civilians."

== In popular culture ==
- "Metalhead", a 2017 episode of Black Mirror, features killer-robot dogs resembling, and inspired by, Boston Dynamics robot dogs.
- In June 2019, a parody video went viral across social media in which a robot resembling Atlas was abused, before turning on its human attackers. The video turned out to be the work of Corridor Digital, who used the watermark "Bosstown Dynamics" instead of "Boston Dynamics". This video tricked many people, causing them to believe it was real.
- In Heroes of the Storm (2015), a multiplayer video game by Blizzard Entertainment, playable heroes are able to move quickly through the battleground by using a mount called "Project: D.E.R.P.A.", which references one of Boston Dynamics' quadrupedal robots.
- The HBO Show Silicon Valley has made two prominent references to the company – an episode featured a robotics company called Somerville Dynamics, named after Somerville, a city that neighbors Boston; and the season premiere of Season 3 featured a real Boston Dynamics Spot robot, seen crossing a street.
- In 2022 the Spot robot was featured as a background extra in an episode of The Book of Boba Fett TV series.
- In May 2025, Boston Dynamics auditioned on Season 20 of America's Got Talent, performing a dance routine with robotic "dogs".

== See also ==
- Unitree
- Biomimetics
- List of robotic dogs
